

34001–34100 

|-bgcolor=#d6d6d6
| 34001 ||  || — || July 24, 2000 || Socorro || LINEAR || — || align=right | 5.5 km || 
|-id=002 bgcolor=#fefefe
| 34002 Movsesian ||  ||  || July 24, 2000 || Socorro || LINEAR || V || align=right | 2.4 km || 
|-id=003 bgcolor=#fefefe
| 34003 Ivozell ||  ||  || July 29, 2000 || Socorro || LINEAR || — || align=right | 4.6 km || 
|-id=004 bgcolor=#fefefe
| 34004 Gregorini ||  ||  || July 30, 2000 || Montelupo || M. Tombelli, D. Guidetti || NYS || align=right | 7.5 km || 
|-id=005 bgcolor=#d6d6d6
| 34005 ||  || — || July 30, 2000 || Socorro || LINEAR || — || align=right | 6.0 km || 
|-id=006 bgcolor=#E9E9E9
| 34006 ||  || — || July 31, 2000 || Črni Vrh || Črni Vrh || — || align=right | 3.3 km || 
|-id=007 bgcolor=#E9E9E9
| 34007 ||  || — || July 23, 2000 || Socorro || LINEAR || VIB || align=right | 5.9 km || 
|-id=008 bgcolor=#fefefe
| 34008 ||  || — || July 23, 2000 || Socorro || LINEAR || NYS || align=right | 2.1 km || 
|-id=009 bgcolor=#fefefe
| 34009 ||  || — || July 23, 2000 || Socorro || LINEAR || MAS || align=right | 1.8 km || 
|-id=010 bgcolor=#fefefe
| 34010 Tassiloschwarz ||  ||  || July 23, 2000 || Socorro || LINEAR || FLO || align=right | 2.7 km || 
|-id=011 bgcolor=#fefefe
| 34011 Divyakranthi ||  ||  || July 23, 2000 || Socorro || LINEAR || NYS || align=right | 2.8 km || 
|-id=012 bgcolor=#fefefe
| 34012 Prashaant ||  ||  || July 23, 2000 || Socorro || LINEAR || FLO || align=right | 1.9 km || 
|-id=013 bgcolor=#E9E9E9
| 34013 ||  || — || July 23, 2000 || Socorro || LINEAR || — || align=right | 2.5 km || 
|-id=014 bgcolor=#E9E9E9
| 34014 Pingali ||  ||  || July 23, 2000 || Socorro || LINEAR || — || align=right | 2.7 km || 
|-id=015 bgcolor=#fefefe
| 34015 ||  || — || July 23, 2000 || Socorro || LINEAR || NYS || align=right | 1.7 km || 
|-id=016 bgcolor=#fefefe
| 34016 Chaitanya ||  ||  || July 23, 2000 || Socorro || LINEAR || — || align=right | 2.2 km || 
|-id=017 bgcolor=#E9E9E9
| 34017 Geeve ||  ||  || July 23, 2000 || Socorro || LINEAR || AST || align=right | 6.4 km || 
|-id=018 bgcolor=#E9E9E9
| 34018 ||  || — || July 31, 2000 || Socorro || LINEAR || — || align=right | 4.4 km || 
|-id=019 bgcolor=#E9E9E9
| 34019 ||  || — || July 30, 2000 || Socorro || LINEAR || — || align=right | 4.4 km || 
|-id=020 bgcolor=#fefefe
| 34020 ||  || — || July 30, 2000 || Socorro || LINEAR || — || align=right | 3.4 km || 
|-id=021 bgcolor=#fefefe
| 34021 Suhanijain ||  ||  || July 23, 2000 || Socorro || LINEAR || — || align=right | 2.2 km || 
|-id=022 bgcolor=#d6d6d6
| 34022 ||  || — || July 23, 2000 || Socorro || LINEAR || — || align=right | 8.4 km || 
|-id=023 bgcolor=#E9E9E9
| 34023 ||  || — || July 23, 2000 || Socorro || LINEAR || — || align=right | 3.0 km || 
|-id=024 bgcolor=#fefefe
| 34024 Cormaclarkin ||  ||  || July 23, 2000 || Socorro || LINEAR || NYS || align=right | 2.7 km || 
|-id=025 bgcolor=#fefefe
| 34025 Caolannbrady ||  ||  || July 23, 2000 || Socorro || LINEAR || FLO || align=right | 2.7 km || 
|-id=026 bgcolor=#fefefe
| 34026 Valpagliarino ||  ||  || July 23, 2000 || Socorro || LINEAR || NYS || align=right | 3.2 km || 
|-id=027 bgcolor=#fefefe
| 34027 ||  || — || July 23, 2000 || Socorro || LINEAR || — || align=right | 2.2 km || 
|-id=028 bgcolor=#fefefe
| 34028 Wuhuiyi ||  ||  || July 23, 2000 || Socorro || LINEAR || FLO || align=right | 2.1 km || 
|-id=029 bgcolor=#E9E9E9
| 34029 ||  || — || July 23, 2000 || Socorro || LINEAR || — || align=right | 5.0 km || 
|-id=030 bgcolor=#E9E9E9
| 34030 Tabuchi ||  ||  || July 23, 2000 || Socorro || LINEAR || — || align=right | 3.0 km || 
|-id=031 bgcolor=#fefefe
| 34031 Fukumitsu ||  ||  || July 23, 2000 || Socorro || LINEAR || NYS || align=right | 2.4 km || 
|-id=032 bgcolor=#E9E9E9
| 34032 ||  || — || July 23, 2000 || Socorro || LINEAR || — || align=right | 4.4 km || 
|-id=033 bgcolor=#d6d6d6
| 34033 ||  || — || July 23, 2000 || Socorro || LINEAR || EOS || align=right | 8.2 km || 
|-id=034 bgcolor=#E9E9E9
| 34034 Shehadeh ||  ||  || July 23, 2000 || Socorro || LINEAR || — || align=right | 5.7 km || 
|-id=035 bgcolor=#E9E9E9
| 34035 ||  || — || July 23, 2000 || Socorro || LINEAR || MAR || align=right | 5.8 km || 
|-id=036 bgcolor=#fefefe
| 34036 ||  || — || July 23, 2000 || Socorro || LINEAR || PHO || align=right | 6.7 km || 
|-id=037 bgcolor=#E9E9E9
| 34037 ||  || — || July 24, 2000 || Socorro || LINEAR || MAR || align=right | 3.9 km || 
|-id=038 bgcolor=#fefefe
| 34038 Abualragheb ||  ||  || July 24, 2000 || Socorro || LINEAR || FLO || align=right | 2.0 km || 
|-id=039 bgcolor=#fefefe
| 34039 Torsteinvik ||  ||  || July 30, 2000 || Socorro || LINEAR || — || align=right | 3.2 km || 
|-id=040 bgcolor=#E9E9E9
| 34040 ||  || — || July 30, 2000 || Socorro || LINEAR || GEF || align=right | 7.9 km || 
|-id=041 bgcolor=#E9E9E9
| 34041 ||  || — || July 30, 2000 || Socorro || LINEAR || EUN || align=right | 3.6 km || 
|-id=042 bgcolor=#fefefe
| 34042 Espeseth ||  ||  || July 30, 2000 || Socorro || LINEAR || — || align=right | 2.0 km || 
|-id=043 bgcolor=#E9E9E9
| 34043 ||  || — || July 30, 2000 || Socorro || LINEAR || — || align=right | 7.5 km || 
|-id=044 bgcolor=#fefefe
| 34044 Obafial ||  ||  || July 30, 2000 || Socorro || LINEAR || — || align=right | 2.5 km || 
|-id=045 bgcolor=#E9E9E9
| 34045 ||  || — || July 30, 2000 || Socorro || LINEAR || slow || align=right | 3.7 km || 
|-id=046 bgcolor=#d6d6d6
| 34046 ||  || — || July 30, 2000 || Socorro || LINEAR || EOS || align=right | 5.2 km || 
|-id=047 bgcolor=#fefefe
| 34047 Gloria ||  ||  || July 30, 2000 || Socorro || LINEAR || V || align=right | 2.6 km || 
|-id=048 bgcolor=#FA8072
| 34048 ||  || — || July 31, 2000 || Socorro || LINEAR || — || align=right | 2.0 km || 
|-id=049 bgcolor=#E9E9E9
| 34049 Myrelleangela ||  ||  || July 30, 2000 || Socorro || LINEAR || — || align=right | 3.3 km || 
|-id=050 bgcolor=#E9E9E9
| 34050 ||  || — || July 30, 2000 || Socorro || LINEAR || — || align=right | 7.8 km || 
|-id=051 bgcolor=#d6d6d6
| 34051 ||  || — || July 30, 2000 || Socorro || LINEAR || — || align=right | 3.6 km || 
|-id=052 bgcolor=#E9E9E9
| 34052 ||  || — || July 30, 2000 || Socorro || LINEAR || HNS || align=right | 6.1 km || 
|-id=053 bgcolor=#d6d6d6
| 34053 Carlquines ||  ||  || July 30, 2000 || Socorro || LINEAR || — || align=right | 3.8 km || 
|-id=054 bgcolor=#d6d6d6
| 34054 ||  || — || July 30, 2000 || Socorro || LINEAR || — || align=right | 7.2 km || 
|-id=055 bgcolor=#E9E9E9
| 34055 ||  || — || July 30, 2000 || Socorro || LINEAR || EUN || align=right | 4.1 km || 
|-id=056 bgcolor=#E9E9E9
| 34056 ||  || — || July 30, 2000 || Socorro || LINEAR || — || align=right | 4.9 km || 
|-id=057 bgcolor=#E9E9E9
| 34057 ||  || — || July 30, 2000 || Socorro || LINEAR || EUN || align=right | 5.5 km || 
|-id=058 bgcolor=#E9E9E9
| 34058 ||  || — || July 30, 2000 || Socorro || LINEAR || — || align=right | 4.1 km || 
|-id=059 bgcolor=#d6d6d6
| 34059 ||  || — || July 30, 2000 || Socorro || LINEAR || — || align=right | 8.0 km || 
|-id=060 bgcolor=#E9E9E9
| 34060 ||  || — || July 30, 2000 || Socorro || LINEAR || GEF || align=right | 7.8 km || 
|-id=061 bgcolor=#fefefe
| 34061 ||  || — || July 31, 2000 || Socorro || LINEAR || — || align=right | 5.3 km || 
|-id=062 bgcolor=#d6d6d6
| 34062 ||  || — || July 31, 2000 || Socorro || LINEAR || — || align=right | 10 km || 
|-id=063 bgcolor=#fefefe
| 34063 Mariamakarova ||  ||  || July 31, 2000 || Socorro || LINEAR || FLO || align=right | 2.0 km || 
|-id=064 bgcolor=#d6d6d6
| 34064 ||  || — || July 30, 2000 || Socorro || LINEAR || — || align=right | 11 km || 
|-id=065 bgcolor=#E9E9E9
| 34065 ||  || — || July 31, 2000 || Socorro || LINEAR || — || align=right | 4.1 km || 
|-id=066 bgcolor=#d6d6d6
| 34066 ||  || — || July 31, 2000 || Socorro || LINEAR || — || align=right | 8.3 km || 
|-id=067 bgcolor=#d6d6d6
| 34067 ||  || — || July 29, 2000 || Anderson Mesa || LONEOS || 7:4 || align=right | 6.2 km || 
|-id=068 bgcolor=#d6d6d6
| 34068 ||  || — || July 29, 2000 || Anderson Mesa || LONEOS || — || align=right | 5.1 km || 
|-id=069 bgcolor=#d6d6d6
| 34069 ||  || — || July 29, 2000 || Anderson Mesa || LONEOS || VER || align=right | 8.3 km || 
|-id=070 bgcolor=#d6d6d6
| 34070 ||  || — || July 29, 2000 || Anderson Mesa || LONEOS || — || align=right | 6.0 km || 
|-id=071 bgcolor=#fefefe
| 34071 ||  || — || July 29, 2000 || Anderson Mesa || LONEOS || — || align=right | 4.1 km || 
|-id=072 bgcolor=#fefefe
| 34072 ||  || — || July 29, 2000 || Anderson Mesa || LONEOS || — || align=right | 1.8 km || 
|-id=073 bgcolor=#E9E9E9
| 34073 ||  || — || July 29, 2000 || Anderson Mesa || LONEOS || — || align=right | 5.3 km || 
|-id=074 bgcolor=#fefefe
| 34074 ||  || — || July 29, 2000 || Anderson Mesa || LONEOS || NYS || align=right | 1.9 km || 
|-id=075 bgcolor=#d6d6d6
| 34075 ||  || — || July 29, 2000 || Anderson Mesa || LONEOS || — || align=right | 8.5 km || 
|-id=076 bgcolor=#E9E9E9
| 34076 ||  || — || July 29, 2000 || Anderson Mesa || LONEOS || — || align=right | 4.8 km || 
|-id=077 bgcolor=#E9E9E9
| 34077 Yoshiakifuse ||  ||  || July 30, 2000 || Cerro Tololo || M. W. Buie || — || align=right | 2.9 km || 
|-id=078 bgcolor=#E9E9E9
| 34078 || 2000 PF || — || August 1, 2000 || Črni Vrh || Črni Vrh || — || align=right | 6.6 km || 
|-id=079 bgcolor=#fefefe
| 34079 Samoylova ||  ||  || August 1, 2000 || Socorro || LINEAR || V || align=right | 2.5 km || 
|-id=080 bgcolor=#E9E9E9
| 34080 Clarakeng ||  ||  || August 1, 2000 || Socorro || LINEAR || — || align=right | 5.0 km || 
|-id=081 bgcolor=#fefefe
| 34081 Chowkitmun ||  ||  || August 1, 2000 || Socorro || LINEAR || V || align=right | 2.5 km || 
|-id=082 bgcolor=#d6d6d6
| 34082 ||  || — || August 1, 2000 || Socorro || LINEAR || — || align=right | 7.4 km || 
|-id=083 bgcolor=#E9E9E9
| 34083 Feretova ||  ||  || August 1, 2000 || Socorro || LINEAR || — || align=right | 2.7 km || 
|-id=084 bgcolor=#E9E9E9
| 34084 ||  || — || August 1, 2000 || Socorro || LINEAR || — || align=right | 3.3 km || 
|-id=085 bgcolor=#E9E9E9
| 34085 ||  || — || August 5, 2000 || Haleakala || NEAT || HEN || align=right | 2.7 km || 
|-id=086 bgcolor=#fefefe
| 34086 ||  || — || August 5, 2000 || Prescott || P. G. Comba || V || align=right | 2.8 km || 
|-id=087 bgcolor=#d6d6d6
| 34087 ||  || — || August 1, 2000 || Črni Vrh || Črni Vrh || KOR || align=right | 3.4 km || 
|-id=088 bgcolor=#fefefe
| 34088 Satokosuka ||  ||  || August 6, 2000 || Bisei SG Center || BATTeRS || — || align=right | 2.4 km || 
|-id=089 bgcolor=#E9E9E9
| 34089 Smoter ||  ||  || August 2, 2000 || Socorro || LINEAR || — || align=right | 3.1 km || 
|-id=090 bgcolor=#fefefe
| 34090 Cewhang ||  ||  || August 1, 2000 || Socorro || LINEAR || — || align=right | 2.3 km || 
|-id=091 bgcolor=#d6d6d6
| 34091 ||  || — || August 1, 2000 || Socorro || LINEAR || — || align=right | 9.3 km || 
|-id=092 bgcolor=#E9E9E9
| 34092 ||  || — || August 1, 2000 || Socorro || LINEAR || — || align=right | 3.4 km || 
|-id=093 bgcolor=#E9E9E9
| 34093 ||  || — || August 1, 2000 || Socorro || LINEAR || ADE || align=right | 9.5 km || 
|-id=094 bgcolor=#E9E9E9
| 34094 ||  || — || August 1, 2000 || Socorro || LINEAR || — || align=right | 4.1 km || 
|-id=095 bgcolor=#E9E9E9
| 34095 ||  || — || August 1, 2000 || Socorro || LINEAR || EUN || align=right | 4.6 km || 
|-id=096 bgcolor=#d6d6d6
| 34096 ||  || — || August 1, 2000 || Socorro || LINEAR || URS || align=right | 9.2 km || 
|-id=097 bgcolor=#d6d6d6
| 34097 ||  || — || August 1, 2000 || Socorro || LINEAR || ALA || align=right | 10 km || 
|-id=098 bgcolor=#d6d6d6
| 34098 ||  || — || August 2, 2000 || Socorro || LINEAR || VER || align=right | 8.5 km || 
|-id=099 bgcolor=#d6d6d6
| 34099 ||  || — || August 8, 2000 || Socorro || LINEAR || — || align=right | 5.3 km || 
|-id=100 bgcolor=#fefefe
| 34100 Thapa ||  ||  || August 1, 2000 || Socorro || LINEAR || V || align=right | 2.4 km || 
|}

34101–34200 

|-bgcolor=#fefefe
| 34101 Hesrivastava ||  ||  || August 1, 2000 || Socorro || LINEAR || V || align=right | 6.6 km || 
|-id=102 bgcolor=#d6d6d6
| 34102 Shawnzhang ||  ||  || August 1, 2000 || Socorro || LINEAR || — || align=right | 6.1 km || 
|-id=103 bgcolor=#d6d6d6
| 34103 Suganthkannan ||  ||  || August 1, 2000 || Socorro || LINEAR || KOR || align=right | 4.0 km || 
|-id=104 bgcolor=#E9E9E9
| 34104 Jeremiahpate ||  ||  || August 1, 2000 || Socorro || LINEAR || — || align=right | 6.0 km || 
|-id=105 bgcolor=#E9E9E9
| 34105 ||  || — || August 1, 2000 || Socorro || LINEAR || — || align=right | 4.2 km || 
|-id=106 bgcolor=#fefefe
| 34106 Sakhrani ||  ||  || August 2, 2000 || Socorro || LINEAR || — || align=right | 3.0 km || 
|-id=107 bgcolor=#d6d6d6
| 34107 Kashfiarahman ||  ||  || August 2, 2000 || Socorro || LINEAR || THM || align=right | 5.5 km || 
|-id=108 bgcolor=#d6d6d6
| 34108 ||  || — || August 2, 2000 || Socorro || LINEAR || — || align=right | 6.2 km || 
|-id=109 bgcolor=#fefefe
| 34109 ||  || — || August 2, 2000 || Socorro || LINEAR || NYS || align=right | 2.4 km || 
|-id=110 bgcolor=#d6d6d6
| 34110 ||  || — || August 3, 2000 || Socorro || LINEAR || EMA || align=right | 9.4 km || 
|-id=111 bgcolor=#d6d6d6
| 34111 ||  || — || August 3, 2000 || Socorro || LINEAR || — || align=right | 8.8 km || 
|-id=112 bgcolor=#d6d6d6
| 34112 ||  || — || August 3, 2000 || Socorro || LINEAR || — || align=right | 8.3 km || 
|-id=113 bgcolor=#fefefe
| 34113 ||  || — || August 3, 2000 || Kitt Peak || Spacewatch || — || align=right | 2.3 km || 
|-id=114 bgcolor=#d6d6d6
| 34114 ||  || — || August 5, 2000 || Haleakala || NEAT || EOS || align=right | 6.7 km || 
|-id=115 bgcolor=#E9E9E9
| 34115 ||  || — || August 5, 2000 || Haleakala || NEAT || — || align=right | 8.7 km || 
|-id=116 bgcolor=#d6d6d6
| 34116 ||  || — || August 5, 2000 || Haleakala || NEAT || — || align=right | 14 km || 
|-id=117 bgcolor=#E9E9E9
| 34117 ||  || — || August 9, 2000 || Socorro || LINEAR || — || align=right | 2.8 km || 
|-id=118 bgcolor=#fefefe
| 34118 ||  || — || August 9, 2000 || Socorro || LINEAR || — || align=right | 2.7 km || 
|-id=119 bgcolor=#d6d6d6
| 34119 ||  || — || August 9, 2000 || Socorro || LINEAR || EUP || align=right | 20 km || 
|-id=120 bgcolor=#fefefe
| 34120 ||  || — || August 4, 2000 || Haleakala || NEAT || — || align=right | 2.4 km || 
|-id=121 bgcolor=#E9E9E9
| 34121 ||  || — || August 1, 2000 || Socorro || LINEAR || — || align=right | 4.9 km || 
|-id=122 bgcolor=#fefefe
| 34122 ||  || — || August 1, 2000 || Socorro || LINEAR || — || align=right | 2.8 km || 
|-id=123 bgcolor=#E9E9E9
| 34123 Uedayukika || 2000 QD ||  || August 25, 2000 || Bisei SG Center || BATTeRS || — || align=right | 13 km || 
|-id=124 bgcolor=#fefefe
| 34124 || 2000 QS || — || August 22, 2000 || Višnjan Observatory || K. Korlević, M. Jurić || — || align=right | 5.9 km || 
|-id=125 bgcolor=#d6d6d6
| 34125 || 2000 QZ || — || August 23, 2000 || Gnosca || S. Sposetti || THM || align=right | 5.4 km || 
|-id=126 bgcolor=#E9E9E9
| 34126 ||  || — || August 23, 2000 || Gnosca || S. Sposetti || — || align=right | 5.5 km || 
|-id=127 bgcolor=#E9E9E9
| 34127 Adamnayak ||  ||  || August 24, 2000 || Socorro || LINEAR || — || align=right | 4.6 km || 
|-id=128 bgcolor=#d6d6d6
| 34128 Hannahbrown ||  ||  || August 24, 2000 || Socorro || LINEAR || EOS || align=right | 5.1 km || 
|-id=129 bgcolor=#d6d6d6
| 34129 Madisonsneve ||  ||  || August 24, 2000 || Socorro || LINEAR || KOR || align=right | 4.1 km || 
|-id=130 bgcolor=#fefefe
| 34130 Isabellaivy ||  ||  || August 24, 2000 || Socorro || LINEAR || V || align=right | 2.5 km || 
|-id=131 bgcolor=#fefefe
| 34131 ||  || — || August 24, 2000 || Socorro || LINEAR || — || align=right | 2.4 km || 
|-id=132 bgcolor=#fefefe
| 34132 Theoguerin ||  ||  || August 24, 2000 || Socorro || LINEAR || — || align=right | 4.6 km || 
|-id=133 bgcolor=#d6d6d6
| 34133 Charlesfenske ||  ||  || August 24, 2000 || Socorro || LINEAR || — || align=right | 7.7 km || 
|-id=134 bgcolor=#E9E9E9
| 34134 Zlokapa ||  ||  || August 24, 2000 || Socorro || LINEAR || — || align=right | 3.3 km || 
|-id=135 bgcolor=#d6d6d6
| 34135 Rahulsubra ||  ||  || August 24, 2000 || Socorro || LINEAR || THM || align=right | 5.5 km || 
|-id=136 bgcolor=#fefefe
| 34136 ||  || — || August 24, 2000 || Višnjan Observatory || K. Korlević, M. Jurić || — || align=right | 2.9 km || 
|-id=137 bgcolor=#fefefe
| 34137 Lonnielinda ||  ||  || August 21, 2000 || Terre Haute || C. Wolfe || NYS || align=right | 1.8 km || 
|-id=138 bgcolor=#E9E9E9
| 34138 Frasso Sabino ||  ||  || August 25, 2000 || Frasso Sabino || Frasso Sabino Obs. || — || align=right | 4.2 km || 
|-id=139 bgcolor=#d6d6d6
| 34139 Lucabarcelo ||  ||  || August 24, 2000 || Socorro || LINEAR || — || align=right | 7.4 km || 
|-id=140 bgcolor=#E9E9E9
| 34140 ||  || — || August 24, 2000 || Socorro || LINEAR || — || align=right | 4.1 km || 
|-id=141 bgcolor=#d6d6d6
| 34141 Antonwu ||  ||  || August 24, 2000 || Socorro || LINEAR || KOR || align=right | 4.1 km || 
|-id=142 bgcolor=#d6d6d6
| 34142 Sachinkonan ||  ||  || August 24, 2000 || Socorro || LINEAR || THM || align=right | 5.2 km || 
|-id=143 bgcolor=#E9E9E9
| 34143 Heeric ||  ||  || August 24, 2000 || Socorro || LINEAR || — || align=right | 2.6 km || 
|-id=144 bgcolor=#fefefe
| 34144 Alexandersun ||  ||  || August 24, 2000 || Socorro || LINEAR || — || align=right | 2.2 km || 
|-id=145 bgcolor=#d6d6d6
| 34145 ||  || — || August 24, 2000 || Socorro || LINEAR || — || align=right | 6.4 km || 
|-id=146 bgcolor=#d6d6d6
| 34146 ||  || — || August 24, 2000 || Socorro || LINEAR || — || align=right | 8.4 km || 
|-id=147 bgcolor=#E9E9E9
| 34147 Vengadesan ||  ||  || August 24, 2000 || Socorro || LINEAR || — || align=right | 4.8 km || 
|-id=148 bgcolor=#fefefe
| 34148 Marchuo ||  ||  || August 24, 2000 || Socorro || LINEAR || — || align=right | 3.1 km || 
|-id=149 bgcolor=#fefefe
| 34149 ||  || — || August 24, 2000 || Socorro || LINEAR || NYS || align=right | 1.7 km || 
|-id=150 bgcolor=#fefefe
| 34150 ||  || — || August 24, 2000 || Socorro || LINEAR || FLO || align=right | 2.5 km || 
|-id=151 bgcolor=#fefefe
| 34151 ||  || — || August 24, 2000 || Socorro || LINEAR || — || align=right | 2.2 km || 
|-id=152 bgcolor=#d6d6d6
| 34152 Kendrazhang ||  ||  || August 24, 2000 || Socorro || LINEAR || — || align=right | 5.4 km || 
|-id=153 bgcolor=#d6d6d6
| 34153 Deeannguo ||  ||  || August 24, 2000 || Socorro || LINEAR || THM || align=right | 5.7 km || 
|-id=154 bgcolor=#fefefe
| 34154 Anushkanair ||  ||  || August 24, 2000 || Socorro || LINEAR || NYS || align=right | 2.2 km || 
|-id=155 bgcolor=#fefefe
| 34155 ||  || — || August 25, 2000 || Socorro || LINEAR || — || align=right | 7.3 km || 
|-id=156 bgcolor=#fefefe
| 34156 Gopalakrishnan ||  ||  || August 25, 2000 || Socorro || LINEAR || — || align=right | 3.0 km || 
|-id=157 bgcolor=#fefefe
| 34157 ||  || — || August 25, 2000 || Socorro || LINEAR || — || align=right | 1.9 km || 
|-id=158 bgcolor=#d6d6d6
| 34158 Rachelchang ||  ||  || August 25, 2000 || Socorro || LINEAR || — || align=right | 5.3 km || 
|-id=159 bgcolor=#E9E9E9
| 34159 Ryanthorpe ||  ||  || August 25, 2000 || Socorro || LINEAR || MRX || align=right | 3.2 km || 
|-id=160 bgcolor=#fefefe
| 34160 ||  || — || August 26, 2000 || Kleť || Kleť Obs. || — || align=right | 3.2 km || 
|-id=161 bgcolor=#fefefe
| 34161 Michaellee ||  ||  || August 24, 2000 || Socorro || LINEAR || — || align=right | 2.0 km || 
|-id=162 bgcolor=#d6d6d6
| 34162 Yegnesh ||  ||  || August 24, 2000 || Socorro || LINEAR || KOR || align=right | 3.8 km || 
|-id=163 bgcolor=#fefefe
| 34163 Neyveli ||  ||  || August 24, 2000 || Socorro || LINEAR || FLO || align=right | 2.0 km || 
|-id=164 bgcolor=#fefefe
| 34164 Anikacheerla ||  ||  || August 24, 2000 || Socorro || LINEAR || FLO || align=right | 2.2 km || 
|-id=165 bgcolor=#d6d6d6
| 34165 Nikhilcheerla ||  ||  || August 24, 2000 || Socorro || LINEAR || KOR || align=right | 4.5 km || 
|-id=166 bgcolor=#fefefe
| 34166 Neildeshmukh ||  ||  || August 25, 2000 || Socorro || LINEAR || V || align=right | 3.6 km || 
|-id=167 bgcolor=#d6d6d6
| 34167 ||  || — || August 25, 2000 || Socorro || LINEAR || EOS || align=right | 6.6 km || 
|-id=168 bgcolor=#fefefe
| 34168 ||  || — || August 26, 2000 || Socorro || LINEAR || FLO || align=right | 1.9 km || 
|-id=169 bgcolor=#d6d6d6
| 34169 ||  || — || August 26, 2000 || Socorro || LINEAR || — || align=right | 3.7 km || 
|-id=170 bgcolor=#fefefe
| 34170 ||  || — || August 26, 2000 || Prescott || P. G. Comba || — || align=right | 6.5 km || 
|-id=171 bgcolor=#fefefe
| 34171 ||  || — || August 26, 2000 || Višnjan Observatory || K. Korlević, M. Jurić || V || align=right | 2.7 km || 
|-id=172 bgcolor=#E9E9E9
| 34172 Camillemiles ||  ||  || August 24, 2000 || Socorro || LINEAR || — || align=right | 4.5 km || 
|-id=173 bgcolor=#E9E9E9
| 34173 ||  || — || August 24, 2000 || Socorro || LINEAR || — || align=right | 6.8 km || 
|-id=174 bgcolor=#d6d6d6
| 34174 ||  || — || August 24, 2000 || Socorro || LINEAR || — || align=right | 9.4 km || 
|-id=175 bgcolor=#E9E9E9
| 34175 Joshuadong ||  ||  || August 24, 2000 || Socorro || LINEAR || — || align=right | 6.7 km || 
|-id=176 bgcolor=#E9E9E9
| 34176 Balamurugan ||  ||  || August 24, 2000 || Socorro || LINEAR || — || align=right | 5.7 km || 
|-id=177 bgcolor=#d6d6d6
| 34177 Amandawilson ||  ||  || August 24, 2000 || Socorro || LINEAR || KOR || align=right | 3.9 km || 
|-id=178 bgcolor=#E9E9E9
| 34178 Sarahmarie ||  ||  || August 24, 2000 || Socorro || LINEAR || PAD || align=right | 4.1 km || 
|-id=179 bgcolor=#d6d6d6
| 34179 Bryanchun ||  ||  || August 24, 2000 || Socorro || LINEAR || — || align=right | 5.4 km || 
|-id=180 bgcolor=#E9E9E9
| 34180 Jessicayoung ||  ||  || August 24, 2000 || Socorro || LINEAR || — || align=right | 5.4 km || 
|-id=181 bgcolor=#fefefe
| 34181 Patnaik ||  ||  || August 24, 2000 || Socorro || LINEAR || NYS || align=right | 2.1 km || 
|-id=182 bgcolor=#E9E9E9
| 34182 Sachan ||  ||  || August 24, 2000 || Socorro || LINEAR || — || align=right | 4.1 km || 
|-id=183 bgcolor=#d6d6d6
| 34183 Yeshdoctor ||  ||  || August 24, 2000 || Socorro || LINEAR || THM || align=right | 6.4 km || 
|-id=184 bgcolor=#d6d6d6
| 34184 Hegde ||  ||  || August 24, 2000 || Socorro || LINEAR || — || align=right | 4.8 km || 
|-id=185 bgcolor=#d6d6d6
| 34185 ||  || — || August 24, 2000 || Socorro || LINEAR || — || align=right | 4.6 km || 
|-id=186 bgcolor=#d6d6d6
| 34186 ||  || — || August 24, 2000 || Socorro || LINEAR || — || align=right | 7.2 km || 
|-id=187 bgcolor=#d6d6d6
| 34187 Tomaino ||  ||  || August 24, 2000 || Socorro || LINEAR || — || align=right | 6.8 km || 
|-id=188 bgcolor=#E9E9E9
| 34188 Clarawagner ||  ||  || August 24, 2000 || Socorro || LINEAR || — || align=right | 5.6 km || 
|-id=189 bgcolor=#fefefe
| 34189 Ambatipudi ||  ||  || August 24, 2000 || Socorro || LINEAR || V || align=right | 2.5 km || 
|-id=190 bgcolor=#E9E9E9
| 34190 Erinsmith ||  ||  || August 24, 2000 || Socorro || LINEAR || WIT || align=right | 2.5 km || 
|-id=191 bgcolor=#fefefe
| 34191 Jakhete ||  ||  || August 24, 2000 || Socorro || LINEAR || — || align=right | 3.4 km || 
|-id=192 bgcolor=#E9E9E9
| 34192 Sappington ||  ||  || August 24, 2000 || Socorro || LINEAR || — || align=right | 7.0 km || 
|-id=193 bgcolor=#d6d6d6
| 34193 Annakoonce ||  ||  || August 24, 2000 || Socorro || LINEAR || — || align=right | 7.2 km || 
|-id=194 bgcolor=#E9E9E9
| 34194 Serenajing ||  ||  || August 24, 2000 || Socorro || LINEAR || — || align=right | 5.1 km || 
|-id=195 bgcolor=#E9E9E9
| 34195 ||  || — || August 25, 2000 || Socorro || LINEAR || — || align=right | 6.0 km || 
|-id=196 bgcolor=#E9E9E9
| 34196 ||  || — || August 25, 2000 || Socorro || LINEAR || — || align=right | 7.5 km || 
|-id=197 bgcolor=#fefefe
| 34197 Susrinivasan ||  ||  || August 25, 2000 || Socorro || LINEAR || — || align=right | 2.9 km || 
|-id=198 bgcolor=#E9E9E9
| 34198 Oliverleitner ||  ||  || August 25, 2000 || Socorro || LINEAR || — || align=right | 2.7 km || 
|-id=199 bgcolor=#fefefe
| 34199 Amyjin ||  ||  || August 25, 2000 || Socorro || LINEAR || NYS || align=right | 1.8 km || 
|-id=200 bgcolor=#fefefe
| 34200 Emmasun ||  ||  || August 25, 2000 || Socorro || LINEAR || NYS || align=right | 2.2 km || 
|}

34201–34300 

|-bgcolor=#d6d6d6
| 34201 ||  || — || August 25, 2000 || Socorro || LINEAR || EOS || align=right | 5.2 km || 
|-id=202 bgcolor=#E9E9E9
| 34202 Sionaprasad ||  ||  || August 25, 2000 || Socorro || LINEAR || — || align=right | 7.0 km || 
|-id=203 bgcolor=#E9E9E9
| 34203 ||  || — || August 25, 2000 || Socorro || LINEAR || — || align=right | 6.0 km || 
|-id=204 bgcolor=#E9E9E9
| 34204 Quryshi ||  ||  || August 25, 2000 || Socorro || LINEAR || — || align=right | 7.3 km || 
|-id=205 bgcolor=#fefefe
| 34205 Mizerak ||  ||  || August 26, 2000 || Socorro || LINEAR || FLO || align=right | 2.1 km || 
|-id=206 bgcolor=#d6d6d6
| 34206 Zhiyuewang ||  ||  || August 26, 2000 || Socorro || LINEAR || — || align=right | 5.6 km || 
|-id=207 bgcolor=#d6d6d6
| 34207 ||  || — || August 28, 2000 || Socorro || LINEAR || — || align=right | 6.2 km || 
|-id=208 bgcolor=#E9E9E9
| 34208 Danielzhang ||  ||  || August 28, 2000 || Socorro || LINEAR || — || align=right | 5.7 km || 
|-id=209 bgcolor=#E9E9E9
| 34209 ||  || — || August 28, 2000 || Socorro || LINEAR || — || align=right | 5.9 km || 
|-id=210 bgcolor=#d6d6d6
| 34210 ||  || — || August 28, 2000 || Socorro || LINEAR || LIX || align=right | 15 km || 
|-id=211 bgcolor=#d6d6d6
| 34211 ||  || — || August 28, 2000 || Socorro || LINEAR || EOS || align=right | 6.3 km || 
|-id=212 bgcolor=#E9E9E9
| 34212 ||  || — || August 28, 2000 || Reedy Creek || J. Broughton || HEN || align=right | 3.7 km || 
|-id=213 bgcolor=#d6d6d6
| 34213 ||  || — || August 26, 2000 || Kitt Peak || Spacewatch || EOS || align=right | 4.1 km || 
|-id=214 bgcolor=#E9E9E9
| 34214 ||  || — || August 24, 2000 || Socorro || LINEAR || — || align=right | 3.4 km || 
|-id=215 bgcolor=#E9E9E9
| 34215 Stutigarg ||  ||  || August 24, 2000 || Socorro || LINEAR || — || align=right | 3.3 km || 
|-id=216 bgcolor=#d6d6d6
| 34216 ||  || — || August 24, 2000 || Socorro || LINEAR || — || align=right | 12 km || 
|-id=217 bgcolor=#fefefe
| 34217 ||  || — || August 24, 2000 || Socorro || LINEAR || — || align=right | 3.3 km || 
|-id=218 bgcolor=#d6d6d6
| 34218 Padiyath ||  ||  || August 24, 2000 || Socorro || LINEAR || HYG || align=right | 7.0 km || 
|-id=219 bgcolor=#E9E9E9
| 34219 Megantang ||  ||  || August 24, 2000 || Socorro || LINEAR || — || align=right | 5.3 km || 
|-id=220 bgcolor=#fefefe
| 34220 Pelagiamajoni ||  ||  || August 25, 2000 || Socorro || LINEAR || — || align=right | 2.7 km || 
|-id=221 bgcolor=#d6d6d6
| 34221 ||  || — || August 25, 2000 || Socorro || LINEAR || EOS || align=right | 5.5 km || 
|-id=222 bgcolor=#d6d6d6
| 34222 ||  || — || August 25, 2000 || Socorro || LINEAR || EOS || align=right | 4.1 km || 
|-id=223 bgcolor=#E9E9E9
| 34223 ||  || — || August 25, 2000 || Socorro || LINEAR || EUN || align=right | 3.7 km || 
|-id=224 bgcolor=#fefefe
| 34224 Maggiechen ||  ||  || August 25, 2000 || Socorro || LINEAR || FLO || align=right | 2.8 km || 
|-id=225 bgcolor=#fefefe
| 34225 Fridberg ||  ||  || August 25, 2000 || Socorro || LINEAR || — || align=right | 6.8 km || 
|-id=226 bgcolor=#E9E9E9
| 34226 ||  || — || August 25, 2000 || Socorro || LINEAR || — || align=right | 3.6 km || 
|-id=227 bgcolor=#fefefe
| 34227 Daveyhuang ||  ||  || August 25, 2000 || Socorro || LINEAR || V || align=right | 1.7 km || 
|-id=228 bgcolor=#d6d6d6
| 34228 ||  || — || August 25, 2000 || Socorro || LINEAR || LIX || align=right | 10 km || 
|-id=229 bgcolor=#fefefe
| 34229 ||  || — || August 25, 2000 || Socorro || LINEAR || FLO || align=right | 2.0 km || 
|-id=230 bgcolor=#d6d6d6
| 34230 ||  || — || August 25, 2000 || Socorro || LINEAR || — || align=right | 13 km || 
|-id=231 bgcolor=#d6d6d6
| 34231 Isanisingh ||  ||  || August 26, 2000 || Socorro || LINEAR || — || align=right | 5.5 km || 
|-id=232 bgcolor=#d6d6d6
| 34232 ||  || — || August 26, 2000 || Socorro || LINEAR || EOS || align=right | 5.7 km || 
|-id=233 bgcolor=#E9E9E9
| 34233 Caldwell ||  ||  || August 26, 2000 || Socorro || LINEAR || — || align=right | 4.9 km || 
|-id=234 bgcolor=#fefefe
| 34234 Andrewfang ||  ||  || August 26, 2000 || Socorro || LINEAR || — || align=right | 2.4 km || 
|-id=235 bgcolor=#fefefe
| 34235 Ellafeiner ||  ||  || August 28, 2000 || Socorro || LINEAR || NYS || align=right | 3.7 km || 
|-id=236 bgcolor=#d6d6d6
| 34236 Firester ||  ||  || August 28, 2000 || Socorro || LINEAR || KOR || align=right | 5.9 km || 
|-id=237 bgcolor=#E9E9E9
| 34237 Sarahgao ||  ||  || August 28, 2000 || Socorro || LINEAR || — || align=right | 4.7 km || 
|-id=238 bgcolor=#d6d6d6
| 34238 ||  || — || August 28, 2000 || Socorro || LINEAR || — || align=right | 5.4 km || 
|-id=239 bgcolor=#d6d6d6
| 34239 Louisgolowich ||  ||  || August 28, 2000 || Socorro || LINEAR || — || align=right | 3.4 km || 
|-id=240 bgcolor=#d6d6d6
| 34240 Charleyhutch ||  ||  || August 28, 2000 || Socorro || LINEAR || EOS || align=right | 4.0 km || 
|-id=241 bgcolor=#d6d6d6
| 34241 Skylerjones ||  ||  || August 28, 2000 || Socorro || LINEAR || — || align=right | 6.0 km || 
|-id=242 bgcolor=#fefefe
| 34242 ||  || — || August 28, 2000 || Socorro || LINEAR || FLO || align=right | 2.3 km || 
|-id=243 bgcolor=#d6d6d6
| 34243 ||  || — || August 28, 2000 || Socorro || LINEAR || EOS || align=right | 7.2 km || 
|-id=244 bgcolor=#d6d6d6
| 34244 ||  || — || August 28, 2000 || Socorro || LINEAR || CHA || align=right | 4.6 km || 
|-id=245 bgcolor=#fefefe
| 34245 Andrewkomo ||  ||  || August 28, 2000 || Socorro || LINEAR || — || align=right | 2.5 km || 
|-id=246 bgcolor=#fefefe
| 34246 Kopparapu ||  ||  || August 28, 2000 || Socorro || LINEAR || — || align=right | 1.9 km || 
|-id=247 bgcolor=#d6d6d6
| 34247 ||  || — || August 28, 2000 || Socorro || LINEAR || — || align=right | 6.2 km || 
|-id=248 bgcolor=#d6d6d6
| 34248 ||  || — || August 28, 2000 || Socorro || LINEAR || — || align=right | 5.9 km || 
|-id=249 bgcolor=#E9E9E9
| 34249 Leolo ||  ||  || August 29, 2000 || Socorro || LINEAR || — || align=right | 5.7 km || 
|-id=250 bgcolor=#fefefe
| 34250 Mamichael ||  ||  || August 24, 2000 || Socorro || LINEAR || — || align=right | 3.9 km || 
|-id=251 bgcolor=#E9E9E9
| 34251 Rohanmehrotra ||  ||  || August 24, 2000 || Socorro || LINEAR || — || align=right | 2.4 km || 
|-id=252 bgcolor=#fefefe
| 34252 Orlovsky ||  ||  || August 24, 2000 || Socorro || LINEAR || NYS || align=right | 1.8 km || 
|-id=253 bgcolor=#E9E9E9
| 34253 Nitya ||  ||  || August 24, 2000 || Socorro || LINEAR || — || align=right | 3.9 km || 
|-id=254 bgcolor=#d6d6d6
| 34254 Mihirpatel ||  ||  || August 24, 2000 || Socorro || LINEAR || HYG || align=right | 7.9 km || 
|-id=255 bgcolor=#d6d6d6
| 34255 ||  || — || August 25, 2000 || Socorro || LINEAR || — || align=right | 5.9 km || 
|-id=256 bgcolor=#d6d6d6
| 34256 Advaitpatil ||  ||  || August 28, 2000 || Socorro || LINEAR || KOR || align=right | 3.5 km || 
|-id=257 bgcolor=#d6d6d6
| 34257 ||  || — || August 28, 2000 || Socorro || LINEAR || — || align=right | 8.0 km || 
|-id=258 bgcolor=#E9E9E9
| 34258 Pentland ||  ||  || August 25, 2000 || Socorro || LINEAR || GEF || align=right | 3.8 km || 
|-id=259 bgcolor=#fefefe
| 34259 Abprabhakaran ||  ||  || August 25, 2000 || Socorro || LINEAR || — || align=right | 1.9 km || 
|-id=260 bgcolor=#d6d6d6
| 34260 ||  || — || August 25, 2000 || Socorro || LINEAR || HYG || align=right | 10 km || 
|-id=261 bgcolor=#fefefe
| 34261 Musharahman ||  ||  || August 25, 2000 || Socorro || LINEAR || FLO || align=right | 2.6 km || 
|-id=262 bgcolor=#E9E9E9
| 34262 Michaelren ||  ||  || August 25, 2000 || Socorro || LINEAR || — || align=right | 6.6 km || 
|-id=263 bgcolor=#d6d6d6
| 34263 ||  || — || August 25, 2000 || Socorro || LINEAR || — || align=right | 6.9 km || 
|-id=264 bgcolor=#d6d6d6
| 34264 Sadhuka ||  ||  || August 28, 2000 || Socorro || LINEAR || — || align=right | 4.4 km || 
|-id=265 bgcolor=#d6d6d6
| 34265 ||  || — || August 29, 2000 || Socorro || LINEAR || HYG || align=right | 6.0 km || 
|-id=266 bgcolor=#fefefe
| 34266 Schweinfurth ||  ||  || August 31, 2000 || Socorro || LINEAR || — || align=right | 2.8 km || 
|-id=267 bgcolor=#d6d6d6
| 34267 Haniya ||  ||  || August 31, 2000 || Socorro || LINEAR || — || align=right | 3.9 km || 
|-id=268 bgcolor=#E9E9E9
| 34268 Gracetian ||  ||  || August 25, 2000 || Socorro || LINEAR || — || align=right | 8.8 km || 
|-id=269 bgcolor=#fefefe
| 34269 ||  || — || August 24, 2000 || Socorro || LINEAR || — || align=right | 3.5 km || 
|-id=270 bgcolor=#E9E9E9
| 34270 ||  || — || August 25, 2000 || Socorro || LINEAR || — || align=right | 6.9 km || 
|-id=271 bgcolor=#E9E9E9
| 34271 Vinjaivale ||  ||  || August 26, 2000 || Socorro || LINEAR || — || align=right | 3.3 km || 
|-id=272 bgcolor=#E9E9E9
| 34272 Veeramacheneni ||  ||  || August 26, 2000 || Socorro || LINEAR || — || align=right | 3.0 km || 
|-id=273 bgcolor=#E9E9E9
| 34273 Franklynwang ||  ||  || August 26, 2000 || Socorro || LINEAR || HEN || align=right | 2.9 km || 
|-id=274 bgcolor=#E9E9E9
| 34274 ||  || — || August 26, 2000 || Socorro || LINEAR || — || align=right | 4.0 km || 
|-id=275 bgcolor=#d6d6d6
| 34275 ||  || — || August 28, 2000 || Socorro || LINEAR || URS || align=right | 5.2 km || 
|-id=276 bgcolor=#fefefe
| 34276 ||  || — || August 29, 2000 || Socorro || LINEAR || — || align=right | 2.2 km || 
|-id=277 bgcolor=#d6d6d6
| 34277 Davidxingwu ||  ||  || August 31, 2000 || Socorro || LINEAR || KOR || align=right | 3.4 km || 
|-id=278 bgcolor=#d6d6d6
| 34278 Justinxie ||  ||  || August 31, 2000 || Socorro || LINEAR || — || align=right | 7.8 km || 
|-id=279 bgcolor=#E9E9E9
| 34279 Alicezhang ||  ||  || August 31, 2000 || Socorro || LINEAR || — || align=right | 6.5 km || 
|-id=280 bgcolor=#E9E9E9
| 34280 Victoradler ||  ||  || August 31, 2000 || Socorro || LINEAR || — || align=right | 2.8 km || 
|-id=281 bgcolor=#E9E9E9
| 34281 Albritton ||  ||  || August 31, 2000 || Socorro || LINEAR || — || align=right | 6.9 km || 
|-id=282 bgcolor=#E9E9E9
| 34282 Applegate ||  ||  || August 31, 2000 || Socorro || LINEAR || AGN || align=right | 4.5 km || 
|-id=283 bgcolor=#fefefe
| 34283 Bagley ||  ||  || August 31, 2000 || Socorro || LINEAR || V || align=right | 2.6 km || 
|-id=284 bgcolor=#fefefe
| 34284 Seancampbell ||  ||  || August 31, 2000 || Socorro || LINEAR || FLO || align=right | 2.1 km || 
|-id=285 bgcolor=#E9E9E9
| 34285 Dorothydady ||  ||  || August 31, 2000 || Socorro || LINEAR || — || align=right | 2.4 km || 
|-id=286 bgcolor=#E9E9E9
| 34286 ||  || — || August 31, 2000 || Socorro || LINEAR || EUN || align=right | 5.5 km || 
|-id=287 bgcolor=#d6d6d6
| 34287 ||  || — || August 31, 2000 || Socorro || LINEAR || EOS || align=right | 9.1 km || 
|-id=288 bgcolor=#fefefe
| 34288 Bevindaglen ||  ||  || August 25, 2000 || Socorro || LINEAR || — || align=right | 2.3 km || 
|-id=289 bgcolor=#E9E9E9
| 34289 Johndell ||  ||  || August 25, 2000 || Socorro || LINEAR || — || align=right | 3.4 km || 
|-id=290 bgcolor=#d6d6d6
| 34290 ||  || — || August 25, 2000 || Socorro || LINEAR || EOS || align=right | 7.5 km || 
|-id=291 bgcolor=#d6d6d6
| 34291 ||  || — || August 25, 2000 || Socorro || LINEAR || EOS || align=right | 12 km || 
|-id=292 bgcolor=#d6d6d6
| 34292 ||  || — || August 25, 2000 || Socorro || LINEAR || EOS || align=right | 6.2 km || 
|-id=293 bgcolor=#fefefe
| 34293 Khiemdoba ||  ||  || August 29, 2000 || Socorro || LINEAR || V || align=right | 2.0 km || 
|-id=294 bgcolor=#E9E9E9
| 34294 Taylordufford ||  ||  || August 29, 2000 || Socorro || LINEAR || — || align=right | 5.4 km || 
|-id=295 bgcolor=#E9E9E9
| 34295 ||  || — || August 29, 2000 || Socorro || LINEAR || — || align=right | 3.2 km || 
|-id=296 bgcolor=#fefefe
| 34296 ||  || — || August 29, 2000 || Socorro || LINEAR || — || align=right | 1.9 km || 
|-id=297 bgcolor=#fefefe
| 34297 Willfrazer ||  ||  || August 31, 2000 || Socorro || LINEAR || — || align=right | 3.3 km || 
|-id=298 bgcolor=#C2FFFF
| 34298 ||  || — || August 31, 2000 || Socorro || LINEAR || L5 || align=right | 17 km || 
|-id=299 bgcolor=#d6d6d6
| 34299 ||  || — || August 31, 2000 || Socorro || LINEAR || — || align=right | 6.8 km || 
|-id=300 bgcolor=#d6d6d6
| 34300 Brendafrost ||  ||  || August 31, 2000 || Socorro || LINEAR || HYG || align=right | 8.1 km || 
|}

34301–34400 

|-bgcolor=#E9E9E9
| 34301 ||  || — || August 31, 2000 || Socorro || LINEAR || PAD || align=right | 5.7 km || 
|-id=302 bgcolor=#fefefe
| 34302 Riagalanos ||  ||  || August 31, 2000 || Socorro || LINEAR || — || align=right | 2.8 km || 
|-id=303 bgcolor=#fefefe
| 34303 ||  || — || August 31, 2000 || Socorro || LINEAR || — || align=right | 1.4 km || 
|-id=304 bgcolor=#E9E9E9
| 34304 Alainagarza ||  ||  || August 31, 2000 || Socorro || LINEAR || — || align=right | 5.0 km || 
|-id=305 bgcolor=#d6d6d6
| 34305 ||  || — || August 31, 2000 || Socorro || LINEAR || — || align=right | 9.4 km || 
|-id=306 bgcolor=#fefefe
| 34306 ||  || — || August 25, 2000 || Socorro || LINEAR || NYS || align=right | 3.1 km || 
|-id=307 bgcolor=#E9E9E9
| 34307 Arielhaas ||  ||  || August 26, 2000 || Socorro || LINEAR || — || align=right | 4.3 km || 
|-id=308 bgcolor=#E9E9E9
| 34308 Roberthall ||  ||  || August 26, 2000 || Socorro || LINEAR || — || align=right | 6.9 km || 
|-id=309 bgcolor=#d6d6d6
| 34309 ||  || — || August 26, 2000 || Socorro || LINEAR || — || align=right | 12 km || 
|-id=310 bgcolor=#E9E9E9
| 34310 Markhannum ||  ||  || August 26, 2000 || Socorro || LINEAR || AGN || align=right | 2.4 km || 
|-id=311 bgcolor=#d6d6d6
| 34311 ||  || — || August 26, 2000 || Socorro || LINEAR || — || align=right | 5.3 km || 
|-id=312 bgcolor=#d6d6d6
| 34312 Deahaupt ||  ||  || August 26, 2000 || Socorro || LINEAR || KAR || align=right | 3.5 km || 
|-id=313 bgcolor=#fefefe
| 34313 Lisahevner ||  ||  || August 26, 2000 || Socorro || LINEAR || V || align=right | 1.9 km || 
|-id=314 bgcolor=#fefefe
| 34314 Jasonlee ||  ||  || August 26, 2000 || Socorro || LINEAR || — || align=right | 7.1 km || 
|-id=315 bgcolor=#E9E9E9
| 34315 ||  || — || August 26, 2000 || Socorro || LINEAR || — || align=right | 7.4 km || 
|-id=316 bgcolor=#fefefe
| 34316 Christineleo ||  ||  || August 26, 2000 || Socorro || LINEAR || FLO || align=right | 2.5 km || 
|-id=317 bgcolor=#d6d6d6
| 34317 Fabianmak ||  ||  || August 26, 2000 || Socorro || LINEAR || EMA || align=right | 8.6 km || 
|-id=318 bgcolor=#d6d6d6
| 34318 ||  || — || August 26, 2000 || Socorro || LINEAR || — || align=right | 9.0 km || 
|-id=319 bgcolor=#d6d6d6
| 34319 Neilmilburn ||  ||  || August 29, 2000 || Socorro || LINEAR || — || align=right | 6.5 km || 
|-id=320 bgcolor=#d6d6d6
| 34320 Davidmonge ||  ||  || August 26, 2000 || Socorro || LINEAR || HYG || align=right | 8.5 km || 
|-id=321 bgcolor=#E9E9E9
| 34321 Russellmotter ||  ||  || August 28, 2000 || Socorro || LINEAR || — || align=right | 5.8 km || 
|-id=322 bgcolor=#E9E9E9
| 34322 Marknandor ||  ||  || August 29, 2000 || Socorro || LINEAR || — || align=right | 2.4 km || 
|-id=323 bgcolor=#fefefe
| 34323 Williamrose ||  ||  || August 29, 2000 || Socorro || LINEAR || — || align=right | 5.3 km || 
|-id=324 bgcolor=#d6d6d6
| 34324 Jeremyschwartz ||  ||  || August 29, 2000 || Socorro || LINEAR || — || align=right | 3.4 km || 
|-id=325 bgcolor=#E9E9E9
| 34325 Terrencevale ||  ||  || August 29, 2000 || Socorro || LINEAR || — || align=right | 7.0 km || 
|-id=326 bgcolor=#fefefe
| 34326 Zhaurova ||  ||  || August 29, 2000 || Socorro || LINEAR || NYS || align=right | 6.6 km || 
|-id=327 bgcolor=#E9E9E9
| 34327 ||  || — || August 29, 2000 || Socorro || LINEAR || — || align=right | 6.3 km || 
|-id=328 bgcolor=#E9E9E9
| 34328 Jackalbright ||  ||  || August 31, 2000 || Socorro || LINEAR || PAD || align=right | 5.2 km || 
|-id=329 bgcolor=#E9E9E9
| 34329 Sribhimaraju ||  ||  || August 31, 2000 || Socorro || LINEAR || — || align=right | 6.3 km || 
|-id=330 bgcolor=#fefefe
| 34330 Bissoondial ||  ||  || August 31, 2000 || Socorro || LINEAR || FLO || align=right | 2.6 km || 
|-id=331 bgcolor=#fefefe
| 34331 Annadu ||  ||  || August 31, 2000 || Socorro || LINEAR || NYS || align=right | 2.2 km || 
|-id=332 bgcolor=#d6d6d6
| 34332 Alicefeng ||  ||  || August 31, 2000 || Socorro || LINEAR || KOR || align=right | 4.2 km || 
|-id=333 bgcolor=#d6d6d6
| 34333 Roycorgross ||  ||  || August 31, 2000 || Socorro || LINEAR || — || align=right | 6.6 km || 
|-id=334 bgcolor=#d6d6d6
| 34334 Georgiagrace ||  ||  || August 31, 2000 || Socorro || LINEAR || KOR || align=right | 3.9 km || 
|-id=335 bgcolor=#E9E9E9
| 34335 Ahmadismail ||  ||  || August 31, 2000 || Socorro || LINEAR || MRX || align=right | 3.2 km || 
|-id=336 bgcolor=#d6d6d6
| 34336 Willjenkins ||  ||  || August 31, 2000 || Socorro || LINEAR || KOR || align=right | 4.0 km || 
|-id=337 bgcolor=#fefefe
| 34337 Mihirjoshi ||  ||  || August 31, 2000 || Socorro || LINEAR || NYS || align=right | 5.5 km || 
|-id=338 bgcolor=#E9E9E9
| 34338 Shreyaskar ||  ||  || August 31, 2000 || Socorro || LINEAR || — || align=right | 5.5 km || 
|-id=339 bgcolor=#d6d6d6
| 34339 ||  || — || August 28, 2000 || Socorro || LINEAR || LIX || align=right | 11 km || 
|-id=340 bgcolor=#E9E9E9
| 34340 ||  || — || August 26, 2000 || Kitt Peak || Spacewatch || — || align=right | 5.9 km || 
|-id=341 bgcolor=#fefefe
| 34341 ||  || — || August 26, 2000 || Haleakala || NEAT || V || align=right | 2.4 km || 
|-id=342 bgcolor=#E9E9E9
| 34342 Asmikumar ||  ||  || August 31, 2000 || Socorro || LINEAR || GEF || align=right | 3.5 km || 
|-id=343 bgcolor=#E9E9E9
| 34343 Kumaran ||  ||  || August 31, 2000 || Socorro || LINEAR || — || align=right | 2.8 km || 
|-id=344 bgcolor=#d6d6d6
| 34344 ||  || — || August 31, 2000 || Socorro || LINEAR || — || align=right | 9.3 km || 
|-id=345 bgcolor=#E9E9E9
| 34345 Gabriellalui || 2000 RY ||  || September 1, 2000 || Socorro || LINEAR || — || align=right | 4.3 km || 
|-id=346 bgcolor=#E9E9E9
| 34346 Varunmadan ||  ||  || September 1, 2000 || Socorro || LINEAR || — || align=right | 5.9 km || 
|-id=347 bgcolor=#E9E9E9
| 34347 ||  || — || September 1, 2000 || Socorro || LINEAR || EUN || align=right | 3.9 km || 
|-id=348 bgcolor=#E9E9E9
| 34348 ||  || — || September 1, 2000 || Socorro || LINEAR || EUN || align=right | 5.9 km || 
|-id=349 bgcolor=#d6d6d6
| 34349 ||  || — || September 1, 2000 || Socorro || LINEAR || — || align=right | 10 km || 
|-id=350 bgcolor=#d6d6d6
| 34350 ||  || — || September 1, 2000 || Socorro || LINEAR || — || align=right | 8.7 km || 
|-id=351 bgcolor=#d6d6d6
| 34351 Decatur ||  ||  || September 3, 2000 || Emerald Lane || L. Ball || KOR || align=right | 3.5 km || 
|-id=352 bgcolor=#d6d6d6
| 34352 ||  || — || September 1, 2000 || Socorro || LINEAR || HYG || align=right | 8.4 km || 
|-id=353 bgcolor=#fefefe
| 34353 ||  || — || September 1, 2000 || Socorro || LINEAR || V || align=right | 3.0 km || 
|-id=354 bgcolor=#fefefe
| 34354 Johnmadland ||  ||  || September 1, 2000 || Socorro || LINEAR || V || align=right | 2.9 km || 
|-id=355 bgcolor=#E9E9E9
| 34355 Mefford ||  ||  || September 1, 2000 || Socorro || LINEAR || PAD || align=right | 4.2 km || 
|-id=356 bgcolor=#E9E9E9
| 34356 Gahamuriel ||  ||  || September 1, 2000 || Socorro || LINEAR || — || align=right | 6.0 km || 
|-id=357 bgcolor=#d6d6d6
| 34357 Amaraorth ||  ||  || September 1, 2000 || Socorro || LINEAR || EOS || align=right | 4.5 km || 
|-id=358 bgcolor=#d6d6d6
| 34358 ||  || — || September 1, 2000 || Socorro || LINEAR || — || align=right | 5.6 km || 
|-id=359 bgcolor=#d6d6d6
| 34359 ||  || — || September 1, 2000 || Socorro || LINEAR || — || align=right | 9.9 km || 
|-id=360 bgcolor=#d6d6d6
| 34360 ||  || — || September 1, 2000 || Socorro || LINEAR || — || align=right | 5.9 km || 
|-id=361 bgcolor=#d6d6d6
| 34361 ||  || — || September 1, 2000 || Socorro || LINEAR || — || align=right | 9.5 km || 
|-id=362 bgcolor=#d6d6d6
| 34362 ||  || — || September 1, 2000 || Socorro || LINEAR || EOS || align=right | 7.3 km || 
|-id=363 bgcolor=#fefefe
| 34363 Prawira ||  ||  || September 1, 2000 || Socorro || LINEAR || — || align=right | 2.1 km || 
|-id=364 bgcolor=#d6d6d6
| 34364 Katequinn ||  ||  || September 1, 2000 || Socorro || LINEAR || VER || align=right | 8.7 km || 
|-id=365 bgcolor=#E9E9E9
| 34365 Laurareilly ||  ||  || September 1, 2000 || Socorro || LINEAR || — || align=right | 2.4 km || 
|-id=366 bgcolor=#E9E9E9
| 34366 Rosavestal ||  ||  || September 4, 2000 || Palmer Divide || B. D. Warner || — || align=right | 7.6 km || 
|-id=367 bgcolor=#E9E9E9
| 34367 Kennedyrogers ||  ||  || September 3, 2000 || Socorro || LINEAR || — || align=right | 3.4 km || 
|-id=368 bgcolor=#d6d6d6
| 34368 ||  || — || September 3, 2000 || Socorro || LINEAR || — || align=right | 14 km || 
|-id=369 bgcolor=#d6d6d6
| 34369 ||  || — || September 3, 2000 || Socorro || LINEAR || — || align=right | 9.2 km || 
|-id=370 bgcolor=#d6d6d6
| 34370 ||  || — || September 3, 2000 || Socorro || LINEAR || — || align=right | 5.6 km || 
|-id=371 bgcolor=#d6d6d6
| 34371 ||  || — || September 3, 2000 || Socorro || LINEAR || — || align=right | 14 km || 
|-id=372 bgcolor=#E9E9E9
| 34372 Bentleysiems ||  ||  || September 3, 2000 || Socorro || LINEAR || — || align=right | 4.5 km || 
|-id=373 bgcolor=#E9E9E9
| 34373 ||  || — || September 3, 2000 || Socorro || LINEAR || — || align=right | 6.4 km || 
|-id=374 bgcolor=#d6d6d6
| 34374 ||  || — || September 3, 2000 || Socorro || LINEAR || EOS || align=right | 6.6 km || 
|-id=375 bgcolor=#d6d6d6
| 34375 ||  || — || September 5, 2000 || Socorro || LINEAR || FIR || align=right | 7.3 km || 
|-id=376 bgcolor=#d6d6d6
| 34376 ||  || — || September 3, 2000 || Socorro || LINEAR || EOS || align=right | 7.5 km || 
|-id=377 bgcolor=#E9E9E9
| 34377 ||  || — || September 3, 2000 || Socorro || LINEAR || — || align=right | 5.0 km || 
|-id=378 bgcolor=#d6d6d6
| 34378 ||  || — || September 3, 2000 || Socorro || LINEAR || EOS || align=right | 6.9 km || 
|-id=379 bgcolor=#E9E9E9
| 34379 Slettnes ||  ||  || September 5, 2000 || Socorro || LINEAR || GEF || align=right | 3.8 km || 
|-id=380 bgcolor=#E9E9E9
| 34380 Pratikvangal ||  ||  || September 5, 2000 || Socorro || LINEAR || HEN || align=right | 2.2 km || 
|-id=381 bgcolor=#d6d6d6
| 34381 ||  || — || September 5, 2000 || Socorro || LINEAR || — || align=right | 8.1 km || 
|-id=382 bgcolor=#E9E9E9
| 34382 ||  || — || September 6, 2000 || Socorro || LINEAR || — || align=right | 4.7 km || 
|-id=383 bgcolor=#d6d6d6
| 34383 ||  || — || September 6, 2000 || Socorro || LINEAR || EOS || align=right | 4.6 km || 
|-id=384 bgcolor=#d6d6d6
| 34384 ||  || — || September 1, 2000 || Socorro || LINEAR || — || align=right | 8.6 km || 
|-id=385 bgcolor=#E9E9E9
| 34385 ||  || — || September 1, 2000 || Socorro || LINEAR || — || align=right | 6.4 km || 
|-id=386 bgcolor=#E9E9E9
| 34386 ||  || — || September 1, 2000 || Socorro || LINEAR || CLO || align=right | 11 km || 
|-id=387 bgcolor=#fefefe
| 34387 Venkatesh ||  ||  || September 2, 2000 || Socorro || LINEAR || — || align=right | 2.1 km || 
|-id=388 bgcolor=#fefefe
| 34388 Wylonis ||  ||  || September 2, 2000 || Socorro || LINEAR || FLO || align=right | 2.3 km || 
|-id=389 bgcolor=#d6d6d6
| 34389 ||  || — || September 1, 2000 || Socorro || LINEAR || — || align=right | 7.9 km || 
|-id=390 bgcolor=#E9E9E9
| 34390 ||  || — || September 1, 2000 || Socorro || LINEAR || EUN || align=right | 5.2 km || 
|-id=391 bgcolor=#fefefe
| 34391 Garyzhan ||  ||  || September 2, 2000 || Socorro || LINEAR || — || align=right | 3.8 km || 
|-id=392 bgcolor=#fefefe
| 34392 Afroz ||  ||  || September 2, 2000 || Socorro || LINEAR || MAS || align=right | 2.9 km || 
|-id=393 bgcolor=#d6d6d6
| 34393 Cindyallen ||  ||  || September 2, 2000 || Socorro || LINEAR || THM || align=right | 6.4 km || 
|-id=394 bgcolor=#d6d6d6
| 34394 ||  || — || September 2, 2000 || Socorro || LINEAR || EOS || align=right | 4.6 km || 
|-id=395 bgcolor=#E9E9E9
| 34395 ||  || — || September 2, 2000 || Socorro || LINEAR || — || align=right | 7.6 km || 
|-id=396 bgcolor=#d6d6d6
| 34396 ||  || — || September 3, 2000 || Socorro || LINEAR || HYG || align=right | 6.4 km || 
|-id=397 bgcolor=#d6d6d6
| 34397 Rosaliebarber ||  ||  || September 4, 2000 || Socorro || LINEAR || KOR || align=right | 3.2 km || 
|-id=398 bgcolor=#E9E9E9
| 34398 Terryschmidt ||  ||  || September 9, 2000 || Palmer Divide || B. D. Warner || — || align=right | 5.0 km || 
|-id=399 bgcolor=#E9E9E9
| 34399 Hachiojihigashi ||  ||  || September 7, 2000 || Bisei SG Center || BATTeRS || — || align=right | 7.4 km || 
|-id=400 bgcolor=#E9E9E9
| 34400 Kimbaxter ||  ||  || September 1, 2000 || Socorro || LINEAR || — || align=right | 6.6 km || 
|}

34401–34500 

|-bgcolor=#E9E9E9
| 34401 Kaibeecher ||  ||  || September 1, 2000 || Socorro || LINEAR || — || align=right | 3.6 km || 
|-id=402 bgcolor=#fefefe
| 34402 ||  || — || September 2, 2000 || Anderson Mesa || LONEOS || NYS || align=right | 6.2 km || 
|-id=403 bgcolor=#d6d6d6
| 34403 ||  || — || September 2, 2000 || Anderson Mesa || LONEOS || KOR || align=right | 3.6 km || 
|-id=404 bgcolor=#fefefe
| 34404 Jaybuddi ||  ||  || September 2, 2000 || Socorro || LINEAR || — || align=right | 2.3 km || 
|-id=405 bgcolor=#E9E9E9
| 34405 ||  || — || September 2, 2000 || Anderson Mesa || LONEOS || — || align=right | 5.6 km || 
|-id=406 bgcolor=#fefefe
| 34406 Kristenconn ||  ||  || September 3, 2000 || Socorro || LINEAR || — || align=right | 2.4 km || 
|-id=407 bgcolor=#E9E9E9
| 34407 ||  || — || September 3, 2000 || Socorro || LINEAR || — || align=right | 4.9 km || 
|-id=408 bgcolor=#d6d6d6
| 34408 ||  || — || September 4, 2000 || Anderson Mesa || LONEOS || — || align=right | 5.0 km || 
|-id=409 bgcolor=#d6d6d6
| 34409 ||  || — || September 4, 2000 || Anderson Mesa || LONEOS || EOS || align=right | 5.2 km || 
|-id=410 bgcolor=#E9E9E9
| 34410 ||  || — || September 4, 2000 || Anderson Mesa || LONEOS || HOF || align=right | 7.8 km || 
|-id=411 bgcolor=#d6d6d6
| 34411 ||  || — || September 4, 2000 || Anderson Mesa || LONEOS || SYL7:4 || align=right | 13 km || 
|-id=412 bgcolor=#d6d6d6
| 34412 Tamicruz ||  ||  || September 5, 2000 || Socorro || LINEAR || — || align=right | 8.0 km || 
|-id=413 bgcolor=#d6d6d6
| 34413 ||  || — || September 5, 2000 || Anderson Mesa || LONEOS || — || align=right | 8.0 km || 
|-id=414 bgcolor=#d6d6d6
| 34414 MacLennan ||  ||  || September 5, 2000 || Anderson Mesa || LONEOS || URS || align=right | 6.5 km || 
|-id=415 bgcolor=#E9E9E9
| 34415 Racheldragos ||  ||  || September 6, 2000 || Socorro || LINEAR || — || align=right | 8.6 km || 
|-id=416 bgcolor=#E9E9E9
| 34416 ||  || — || September 6, 2000 || Socorro || LINEAR || — || align=right | 4.3 km || 
|-id=417 bgcolor=#E9E9E9
| 34417 ||  || — || September 7, 2000 || Socorro || LINEAR || EUN || align=right | 4.5 km || 
|-id=418 bgcolor=#fefefe
| 34418 Juliegodfrey ||  ||  || September 20, 2000 || Socorro || LINEAR || — || align=right | 2.5 km || 
|-id=419 bgcolor=#E9E9E9
| 34419 Corning ||  ||  || September 20, 2000 || Elmira || A. J. Cecce || — || align=right | 3.1 km || 
|-id=420 bgcolor=#d6d6d6
| 34420 Peterpau ||  ||  || September 23, 2000 || Desert Beaver || W. K. Y. Yeung || HYG || align=right | 8.5 km || 
|-id=421 bgcolor=#d6d6d6
| 34421 ||  || — || September 20, 2000 || Socorro || LINEAR || — || align=right | 7.0 km || 
|-id=422 bgcolor=#E9E9E9
| 34422 ||  || — || September 23, 2000 || Socorro || LINEAR || EUN || align=right | 4.5 km || 
|-id=423 bgcolor=#E9E9E9
| 34423 ||  || — || September 23, 2000 || Socorro || LINEAR || — || align=right | 7.1 km || 
|-id=424 bgcolor=#d6d6d6
| 34424 Utashima ||  ||  || September 24, 2000 || Bisei SG Center || BATTeRS || EOS || align=right | 4.9 km || 
|-id=425 bgcolor=#fefefe
| 34425 ||  || — || September 20, 2000 || Haleakala || NEAT || — || align=right | 4.3 km || 
|-id=426 bgcolor=#d6d6d6
| 34426 ||  || — || September 20, 2000 || Haleakala || NEAT || — || align=right | 10 km || 
|-id=427 bgcolor=#d6d6d6
| 34427 ||  || — || September 26, 2000 || Višnjan Observatory || K. Korlević || — || align=right | 6.1 km || 
|-id=428 bgcolor=#d6d6d6
| 34428 ||  || — || September 23, 2000 || Socorro || LINEAR || ALA || align=right | 10 km || 
|-id=429 bgcolor=#d6d6d6
| 34429 ||  || — || September 23, 2000 || Socorro || LINEAR || EOS || align=right | 4.5 km || 
|-id=430 bgcolor=#d6d6d6
| 34430 ||  || — || September 24, 2000 || Socorro || LINEAR || HYG || align=right | 8.1 km || 
|-id=431 bgcolor=#d6d6d6
| 34431 ||  || — || September 24, 2000 || Socorro || LINEAR || — || align=right | 5.9 km || 
|-id=432 bgcolor=#d6d6d6
| 34432 Groebe ||  ||  || September 24, 2000 || Socorro || LINEAR || — || align=right | 6.1 km || 
|-id=433 bgcolor=#d6d6d6
| 34433 Kavars ||  ||  || September 24, 2000 || Socorro || LINEAR || THM || align=right | 6.1 km || 
|-id=434 bgcolor=#E9E9E9
| 34434 ||  || — || September 24, 2000 || Socorro || LINEAR || PAD || align=right | 8.7 km || 
|-id=435 bgcolor=#E9E9E9
| 34435 ||  || — || September 24, 2000 || Socorro || LINEAR || — || align=right | 3.5 km || 
|-id=436 bgcolor=#d6d6d6
| 34436 ||  || — || September 24, 2000 || Socorro || LINEAR || — || align=right | 5.6 km || 
|-id=437 bgcolor=#E9E9E9
| 34437 ||  || — || September 26, 2000 || Črni Vrh || Črni Vrh || — || align=right | 5.2 km || 
|-id=438 bgcolor=#fefefe
| 34438 ||  || — || September 26, 2000 || Nachi-Katsuura || Y. Shimizu, T. Urata || V || align=right | 3.5 km || 
|-id=439 bgcolor=#d6d6d6
| 34439 ||  || — || September 21, 2000 || Socorro || LINEAR || — || align=right | 14 km || 
|-id=440 bgcolor=#d6d6d6
| 34440 ||  || — || September 23, 2000 || Socorro || LINEAR || MEL || align=right | 17 km || 
|-id=441 bgcolor=#d6d6d6
| 34441 Thomaslee ||  ||  || September 24, 2000 || Socorro || LINEAR || HYG || align=right | 6.7 km || 
|-id=442 bgcolor=#fefefe
| 34442 ||  || — || September 24, 2000 || Socorro || LINEAR || — || align=right | 5.0 km || 
|-id=443 bgcolor=#d6d6d6
| 34443 Markmadland ||  ||  || September 24, 2000 || Socorro || LINEAR || KOR || align=right | 3.2 km || 
|-id=444 bgcolor=#fefefe
| 34444 Kellmcallister ||  ||  || September 24, 2000 || Socorro || LINEAR || V || align=right | 2.5 km || 
|-id=445 bgcolor=#E9E9E9
| 34445 ||  || — || September 24, 2000 || Socorro || LINEAR || EUN || align=right | 3.4 km || 
|-id=446 bgcolor=#fefefe
| 34446 Karenmccoy ||  ||  || September 24, 2000 || Socorro || LINEAR || V || align=right | 2.9 km || 
|-id=447 bgcolor=#E9E9E9
| 34447 Mesidor ||  ||  || September 24, 2000 || Socorro || LINEAR || — || align=right | 8.3 km || 
|-id=448 bgcolor=#d6d6d6
| 34448 ||  || — || September 24, 2000 || Socorro || LINEAR || — || align=right | 8.8 km || 
|-id=449 bgcolor=#d6d6d6
| 34449 ||  || — || September 24, 2000 || Socorro || LINEAR || THM || align=right | 7.5 km || 
|-id=450 bgcolor=#fefefe
| 34450 Zashamickey ||  ||  || September 24, 2000 || Socorro || LINEAR || — || align=right | 2.1 km || 
|-id=451 bgcolor=#d6d6d6
| 34451 Rebohearn ||  ||  || September 24, 2000 || Socorro || LINEAR || — || align=right | 3.3 km || 
|-id=452 bgcolor=#E9E9E9
| 34452 Jenniparker ||  ||  || September 24, 2000 || Socorro || LINEAR || — || align=right | 5.7 km || 
|-id=453 bgcolor=#d6d6d6
| 34453 Elisapeters ||  ||  || September 24, 2000 || Socorro || LINEAR || KOR || align=right | 3.1 km || 
|-id=454 bgcolor=#E9E9E9
| 34454 ||  || — || September 24, 2000 || Socorro || LINEAR || — || align=right | 6.3 km || 
|-id=455 bgcolor=#d6d6d6
| 34455 ||  || — || September 24, 2000 || Socorro || LINEAR || — || align=right | 11 km || 
|-id=456 bgcolor=#E9E9E9
| 34456 Lydiareznik ||  ||  || September 24, 2000 || Socorro || LINEAR || — || align=right | 7.3 km || 
|-id=457 bgcolor=#d6d6d6
| 34457 Leahroberts ||  ||  || September 24, 2000 || Socorro || LINEAR || — || align=right | 5.8 km || 
|-id=458 bgcolor=#fefefe
| 34458 ||  || — || September 22, 2000 || Socorro || LINEAR || — || align=right | 3.1 km || 
|-id=459 bgcolor=#E9E9E9
| 34459 ||  || — || September 22, 2000 || Socorro || LINEAR || EUN || align=right | 6.8 km || 
|-id=460 bgcolor=#d6d6d6
| 34460 ||  || — || September 23, 2000 || Socorro || LINEAR || URS || align=right | 10 km || 
|-id=461 bgcolor=#d6d6d6
| 34461 ||  || — || September 23, 2000 || Socorro || LINEAR || — || align=right | 6.1 km || 
|-id=462 bgcolor=#fefefe
| 34462 Stoffregen ||  ||  || September 23, 2000 || Socorro || LINEAR || — || align=right | 1.9 km || 
|-id=463 bgcolor=#d6d6d6
| 34463 ||  || — || September 23, 2000 || Socorro || LINEAR || — || align=right | 6.9 km || 
|-id=464 bgcolor=#d6d6d6
| 34464 ||  || — || September 23, 2000 || Socorro || LINEAR || — || align=right | 5.5 km || 
|-id=465 bgcolor=#d6d6d6
| 34465 Swaminathan ||  ||  || September 24, 2000 || Socorro || LINEAR || — || align=right | 5.5 km || 
|-id=466 bgcolor=#d6d6d6
| 34466 Ognicholls ||  ||  || September 24, 2000 || Socorro || LINEAR || — || align=right | 5.7 km || 
|-id=467 bgcolor=#d6d6d6
| 34467 Raphotter ||  ||  || September 24, 2000 || Socorro || LINEAR || — || align=right | 4.4 km || 
|-id=468 bgcolor=#E9E9E9
| 34468 ||  || — || September 30, 2000 || Socorro || LINEAR || — || align=right | 5.2 km || 
|-id=469 bgcolor=#d6d6d6
| 34469 Danishmahmood ||  ||  || September 24, 2000 || Socorro || LINEAR || KOR || align=right | 3.7 km || 
|-id=470 bgcolor=#d6d6d6
| 34470 Chouruihua ||  ||  || September 24, 2000 || Socorro || LINEAR || — || align=right | 7.7 km || 
|-id=471 bgcolor=#d6d6d6
| 34471 Fanyueyang ||  ||  || September 24, 2000 || Socorro || LINEAR || — || align=right | 7.8 km || 
|-id=472 bgcolor=#E9E9E9
| 34472 Guxieran ||  ||  || September 24, 2000 || Socorro || LINEAR || — || align=right | 3.8 km || 
|-id=473 bgcolor=#E9E9E9
| 34473 Linkairui ||  ||  || September 24, 2000 || Socorro || LINEAR || AGN || align=right | 3.6 km || 
|-id=474 bgcolor=#d6d6d6
| 34474 Zhangjingru ||  ||  || September 24, 2000 || Socorro || LINEAR || KOR || align=right | 3.7 km || 
|-id=475 bgcolor=#d6d6d6
| 34475 Zhangyuhui ||  ||  || September 24, 2000 || Socorro || LINEAR || KOR || align=right | 3.9 km || 
|-id=476 bgcolor=#d6d6d6
| 34476 ||  || — || September 24, 2000 || Socorro || LINEAR || — || align=right | 10 km || 
|-id=477 bgcolor=#d6d6d6
| 34477 Muntz ||  ||  || September 24, 2000 || Socorro || LINEAR || THM || align=right | 8.3 km || 
|-id=478 bgcolor=#d6d6d6
| 34478 Jonasboukamp ||  ||  || September 24, 2000 || Socorro || LINEAR || KOR || align=right | 3.2 km || 
|-id=479 bgcolor=#d6d6d6
| 34479 Dunschen ||  ||  || September 24, 2000 || Socorro || LINEAR || KOR || align=right | 3.9 km || 
|-id=480 bgcolor=#d6d6d6
| 34480 ||  || — || September 24, 2000 || Socorro || LINEAR || — || align=right | 14 km || 
|-id=481 bgcolor=#d6d6d6
| 34481 ||  || — || September 24, 2000 || Socorro || LINEAR || — || align=right | 10 km || 
|-id=482 bgcolor=#d6d6d6
| 34482 Jessikirchner ||  ||  || September 24, 2000 || Socorro || LINEAR || — || align=right | 7.5 km || 
|-id=483 bgcolor=#d6d6d6
| 34483 ||  || — || September 24, 2000 || Socorro || LINEAR || — || align=right | 6.1 km || 
|-id=484 bgcolor=#fefefe
| 34484 Kubetzko ||  ||  || September 24, 2000 || Socorro || LINEAR || NYS || align=right | 3.7 km || 
|-id=485 bgcolor=#d6d6d6
| 34485 Nullmeier ||  ||  || September 24, 2000 || Socorro || LINEAR || 628 || align=right | 4.9 km || 
|-id=486 bgcolor=#fefefe
| 34486 ||  || — || September 22, 2000 || Socorro || LINEAR || PHO || align=right | 2.9 km || 
|-id=487 bgcolor=#fefefe
| 34487 ||  || — || September 23, 2000 || Socorro || LINEAR || CHL || align=right | 5.1 km || 
|-id=488 bgcolor=#d6d6d6
| 34488 Lennartresch ||  ||  || September 23, 2000 || Socorro || LINEAR || — || align=right | 4.9 km || 
|-id=489 bgcolor=#d6d6d6
| 34489 ||  || — || September 23, 2000 || Socorro || LINEAR || EOS || align=right | 5.6 km || 
|-id=490 bgcolor=#d6d6d6
| 34490 ||  || — || September 23, 2000 || Socorro || LINEAR || — || align=right | 13 km || 
|-id=491 bgcolor=#fefefe
| 34491 ||  || — || September 23, 2000 || Socorro || LINEAR || — || align=right | 2.4 km || 
|-id=492 bgcolor=#d6d6d6
| 34492 ||  || — || September 23, 2000 || Socorro || LINEAR || EOS || align=right | 4.7 km || 
|-id=493 bgcolor=#d6d6d6
| 34493 ||  || — || September 23, 2000 || Socorro || LINEAR || EOS || align=right | 6.9 km || 
|-id=494 bgcolor=#d6d6d6
| 34494 ||  || — || September 24, 2000 || Socorro || LINEAR || — || align=right | 6.4 km || 
|-id=495 bgcolor=#d6d6d6
| 34495 ||  || — || September 24, 2000 || Socorro || LINEAR || EOS || align=right | 6.1 km || 
|-id=496 bgcolor=#d6d6d6
| 34496 ||  || — || September 24, 2000 || Socorro || LINEAR || — || align=right | 6.6 km || 
|-id=497 bgcolor=#E9E9E9
| 34497 ||  || — || September 24, 2000 || Socorro || LINEAR || — || align=right | 5.9 km || 
|-id=498 bgcolor=#E9E9E9
| 34498 ||  || — || September 24, 2000 || Socorro || LINEAR || — || align=right | 8.1 km || 
|-id=499 bgcolor=#d6d6d6
| 34499 ||  || — || September 24, 2000 || Socorro || LINEAR || EMA || align=right | 11 km || 
|-id=500 bgcolor=#d6d6d6
| 34500 ||  || — || September 24, 2000 || Socorro || LINEAR || — || align=right | 8.1 km || 
|}

34501–34600 

|-bgcolor=#E9E9E9
| 34501 ||  || — || September 24, 2000 || Socorro || LINEAR || GEF || align=right | 6.1 km || 
|-id=502 bgcolor=#E9E9E9
| 34502 ||  || — || September 26, 2000 || Socorro || LINEAR || MAR || align=right | 5.7 km || 
|-id=503 bgcolor=#E9E9E9
| 34503 ||  || — || September 26, 2000 || Socorro || LINEAR || — || align=right | 5.6 km || 
|-id=504 bgcolor=#d6d6d6
| 34504 ||  || — || September 27, 2000 || Socorro || LINEAR || KOR || align=right | 4.2 km || 
|-id=505 bgcolor=#fefefe
| 34505 ||  || — || September 27, 2000 || Socorro || LINEAR || — || align=right | 3.0 km || 
|-id=506 bgcolor=#fefefe
| 34506 ||  || — || September 27, 2000 || Socorro || LINEAR || — || align=right | 4.4 km || 
|-id=507 bgcolor=#E9E9E9
| 34507 ||  || — || September 28, 2000 || Socorro || LINEAR || — || align=right | 8.1 km || 
|-id=508 bgcolor=#E9E9E9
| 34508 ||  || — || September 28, 2000 || Socorro || LINEAR || — || align=right | 7.0 km || 
|-id=509 bgcolor=#fefefe
| 34509 ||  || — || September 28, 2000 || Socorro || LINEAR || — || align=right | 2.7 km || 
|-id=510 bgcolor=#E9E9E9
| 34510 ||  || — || September 28, 2000 || Socorro || LINEAR || — || align=right | 8.8 km || 
|-id=511 bgcolor=#fefefe
| 34511 ||  || — || September 28, 2000 || Socorro || LINEAR || — || align=right | 3.3 km || 
|-id=512 bgcolor=#d6d6d6
| 34512 ||  || — || September 28, 2000 || Socorro || LINEAR || EOS || align=right | 6.2 km || 
|-id=513 bgcolor=#d6d6d6
| 34513 ||  || — || September 28, 2000 || Socorro || LINEAR || 7:4 || align=right | 8.0 km || 
|-id=514 bgcolor=#fefefe
| 34514 ||  || — || September 28, 2000 || Socorro || LINEAR || — || align=right | 3.6 km || 
|-id=515 bgcolor=#E9E9E9
| 34515 ||  || — || September 20, 2000 || Socorro || LINEAR || DOR || align=right | 5.0 km || 
|-id=516 bgcolor=#d6d6d6
| 34516 ||  || — || September 20, 2000 || Socorro || LINEAR || EOS || align=right | 4.9 km || 
|-id=517 bgcolor=#d6d6d6
| 34517 ||  || — || September 20, 2000 || Haleakala || NEAT || EOS || align=right | 5.8 km || 
|-id=518 bgcolor=#d6d6d6
| 34518 ||  || — || September 20, 2000 || Haleakala || NEAT || — || align=right | 5.8 km || 
|-id=519 bgcolor=#d6d6d6
| 34519 ||  || — || September 21, 2000 || Kitt Peak || Spacewatch || THM || align=right | 8.8 km || 
|-id=520 bgcolor=#d6d6d6
| 34520 ||  || — || September 21, 2000 || Haleakala || NEAT || — || align=right | 4.8 km || 
|-id=521 bgcolor=#C2FFFF
| 34521 ||  || — || September 24, 2000 || Socorro || LINEAR || L5 || align=right | 29 km || 
|-id=522 bgcolor=#d6d6d6
| 34522 ||  || — || September 24, 2000 || Socorro || LINEAR || — || align=right | 5.5 km || 
|-id=523 bgcolor=#d6d6d6
| 34523 ||  || — || September 24, 2000 || Socorro || LINEAR || THM || align=right | 7.0 km || 
|-id=524 bgcolor=#E9E9E9
| 34524 ||  || — || September 24, 2000 || Socorro || LINEAR || — || align=right | 4.4 km || 
|-id=525 bgcolor=#fefefe
| 34525 ||  || — || September 24, 2000 || Socorro || LINEAR || NYS || align=right | 3.0 km || 
|-id=526 bgcolor=#d6d6d6
| 34526 ||  || — || September 24, 2000 || Socorro || LINEAR || THM || align=right | 8.2 km || 
|-id=527 bgcolor=#fefefe
| 34527 ||  || — || September 25, 2000 || Socorro || LINEAR || MAS || align=right | 2.0 km || 
|-id=528 bgcolor=#d6d6d6
| 34528 ||  || — || September 25, 2000 || Socorro || LINEAR || EOS || align=right | 4.8 km || 
|-id=529 bgcolor=#E9E9E9
| 34529 ||  || — || September 25, 2000 || Socorro || LINEAR || MAR || align=right | 5.2 km || 
|-id=530 bgcolor=#d6d6d6
| 34530 ||  || — || September 25, 2000 || Socorro || LINEAR || EOS || align=right | 6.0 km || 
|-id=531 bgcolor=#d6d6d6
| 34531 ||  || — || September 25, 2000 || Socorro || LINEAR || TEL || align=right | 3.8 km || 
|-id=532 bgcolor=#d6d6d6
| 34532 ||  || — || September 25, 2000 || Socorro || LINEAR || LIX || align=right | 16 km || 
|-id=533 bgcolor=#d6d6d6
| 34533 ||  || — || September 25, 2000 || Socorro || LINEAR || — || align=right | 6.2 km || 
|-id=534 bgcolor=#fefefe
| 34534 ||  || — || September 26, 2000 || Socorro || LINEAR || V || align=right | 2.1 km || 
|-id=535 bgcolor=#E9E9E9
| 34535 ||  || — || September 26, 2000 || Socorro || LINEAR || — || align=right | 3.5 km || 
|-id=536 bgcolor=#d6d6d6
| 34536 ||  || — || September 26, 2000 || Socorro || LINEAR || ITH || align=right | 4.5 km || 
|-id=537 bgcolor=#d6d6d6
| 34537 ||  || — || September 26, 2000 || Socorro || LINEAR || — || align=right | 5.1 km || 
|-id=538 bgcolor=#d6d6d6
| 34538 ||  || — || September 26, 2000 || Socorro || LINEAR || — || align=right | 7.4 km || 
|-id=539 bgcolor=#E9E9E9
| 34539 ||  || — || September 27, 2000 || Socorro || LINEAR || HEN || align=right | 2.6 km || 
|-id=540 bgcolor=#d6d6d6
| 34540 ||  || — || September 27, 2000 || Socorro || LINEAR || — || align=right | 13 km || 
|-id=541 bgcolor=#d6d6d6
| 34541 ||  || — || September 28, 2000 || Socorro || LINEAR || — || align=right | 5.7 km || 
|-id=542 bgcolor=#d6d6d6
| 34542 ||  || — || September 28, 2000 || Socorro || LINEAR || — || align=right | 7.1 km || 
|-id=543 bgcolor=#d6d6d6
| 34543 Davidbriggs ||  ||  || September 28, 2000 || Socorro || LINEAR || KOR || align=right | 3.7 km || 
|-id=544 bgcolor=#fefefe
| 34544 ||  || — || September 21, 2000 || Socorro || LINEAR || — || align=right | 2.7 km || 
|-id=545 bgcolor=#fefefe
| 34545 ||  || — || September 21, 2000 || Socorro || LINEAR || V || align=right | 3.8 km || 
|-id=546 bgcolor=#fefefe
| 34546 ||  || — || September 21, 2000 || Socorro || LINEAR || — || align=right | 3.0 km || 
|-id=547 bgcolor=#d6d6d6
| 34547 ||  || — || September 21, 2000 || Socorro || LINEAR || — || align=right | 7.9 km || 
|-id=548 bgcolor=#fefefe
| 34548 ||  || — || September 25, 2000 || Socorro || LINEAR || — || align=right | 5.1 km || 
|-id=549 bgcolor=#d6d6d6
| 34549 ||  || — || September 25, 2000 || Socorro || LINEAR || EOS || align=right | 6.3 km || 
|-id=550 bgcolor=#d6d6d6
| 34550 ||  || — || September 26, 2000 || Socorro || LINEAR || — || align=right | 11 km || 
|-id=551 bgcolor=#E9E9E9
| 34551 ||  || — || September 24, 2000 || Socorro || LINEAR || — || align=right | 3.5 km || 
|-id=552 bgcolor=#d6d6d6
| 34552 ||  || — || September 24, 2000 || Socorro || LINEAR || — || align=right | 8.6 km || 
|-id=553 bgcolor=#C2FFFF
| 34553 ||  || — || September 24, 2000 || Socorro || LINEAR || L5 || align=right | 23 km || 
|-id=554 bgcolor=#d6d6d6
| 34554 ||  || — || September 24, 2000 || Socorro || LINEAR || THM || align=right | 7.8 km || 
|-id=555 bgcolor=#d6d6d6
| 34555 ||  || — || September 25, 2000 || Socorro || LINEAR || — || align=right | 7.1 km || 
|-id=556 bgcolor=#E9E9E9
| 34556 ||  || — || September 26, 2000 || Socorro || LINEAR || — || align=right | 8.4 km || 
|-id=557 bgcolor=#d6d6d6
| 34557 ||  || — || September 27, 2000 || Socorro || LINEAR || EOS || align=right | 5.2 km || 
|-id=558 bgcolor=#d6d6d6
| 34558 ||  || — || September 27, 2000 || Socorro || LINEAR || TEL || align=right | 3.3 km || 
|-id=559 bgcolor=#E9E9E9
| 34559 ||  || — || September 28, 2000 || Socorro || LINEAR || AGN || align=right | 2.9 km || 
|-id=560 bgcolor=#d6d6d6
| 34560 ||  || — || September 28, 2000 || Socorro || LINEAR || — || align=right | 9.0 km || 
|-id=561 bgcolor=#d6d6d6
| 34561 ||  || — || September 23, 2000 || Socorro || LINEAR || — || align=right | 6.4 km || 
|-id=562 bgcolor=#d6d6d6
| 34562 ||  || — || September 26, 2000 || Socorro || LINEAR || — || align=right | 15 km || 
|-id=563 bgcolor=#E9E9E9
| 34563 ||  || — || September 27, 2000 || Socorro || LINEAR || MAR || align=right | 3.2 km || 
|-id=564 bgcolor=#E9E9E9
| 34564 ||  || — || September 27, 2000 || Socorro || LINEAR || — || align=right | 7.1 km || 
|-id=565 bgcolor=#d6d6d6
| 34565 ||  || — || September 27, 2000 || Socorro || LINEAR || SAN || align=right | 5.9 km || 
|-id=566 bgcolor=#E9E9E9
| 34566 ||  || — || September 27, 2000 || Socorro || LINEAR || — || align=right | 6.2 km || 
|-id=567 bgcolor=#d6d6d6
| 34567 ||  || — || September 28, 2000 || Socorro || LINEAR || EOS || align=right | 5.3 km || 
|-id=568 bgcolor=#d6d6d6
| 34568 ||  || — || September 30, 2000 || Socorro || LINEAR || — || align=right | 9.9 km || 
|-id=569 bgcolor=#E9E9E9
| 34569 ||  || — || September 30, 2000 || Socorro || LINEAR || — || align=right | 6.9 km || 
|-id=570 bgcolor=#E9E9E9
| 34570 ||  || — || September 30, 2000 || Socorro || LINEAR || — || align=right | 8.2 km || 
|-id=571 bgcolor=#fefefe
| 34571 ||  || — || September 30, 2000 || Socorro || LINEAR || — || align=right | 3.6 km || 
|-id=572 bgcolor=#E9E9E9
| 34572 ||  || — || September 26, 2000 || Socorro || LINEAR || MAR || align=right | 7.3 km || 
|-id=573 bgcolor=#d6d6d6
| 34573 ||  || — || September 30, 2000 || Socorro || LINEAR || URS || align=right | 9.0 km || 
|-id=574 bgcolor=#d6d6d6
| 34574 ||  || — || September 27, 2000 || Socorro || LINEAR || EOS || align=right | 5.8 km || 
|-id=575 bgcolor=#E9E9E9
| 34575 ||  || — || September 29, 2000 || Haleakala || NEAT || — || align=right | 9.7 km || 
|-id=576 bgcolor=#d6d6d6
| 34576 ||  || — || September 27, 2000 || Socorro || LINEAR || — || align=right | 6.4 km || 
|-id=577 bgcolor=#E9E9E9
| 34577 ||  || — || September 26, 2000 || Haleakala || NEAT || — || align=right | 3.0 km || 
|-id=578 bgcolor=#d6d6d6
| 34578 ||  || — || September 25, 2000 || Haleakala || NEAT || — || align=right | 8.8 km || 
|-id=579 bgcolor=#d6d6d6
| 34579 ||  || — || September 25, 2000 || Kitt Peak || Spacewatch || BRA || align=right | 4.0 km || 
|-id=580 bgcolor=#d6d6d6
| 34580 ||  || — || September 24, 2000 || Socorro || LINEAR || KOR || align=right | 3.9 km || 
|-id=581 bgcolor=#d6d6d6
| 34581 ||  || — || September 20, 2000 || Socorro || LINEAR || 7:4 || align=right | 11 km || 
|-id=582 bgcolor=#E9E9E9
| 34582 ||  || — || September 20, 2000 || Socorro || LINEAR || EUN || align=right | 3.6 km || 
|-id=583 bgcolor=#E9E9E9
| 34583 ||  || — || September 29, 2000 || Anderson Mesa || LONEOS || — || align=right | 7.1 km || 
|-id=584 bgcolor=#E9E9E9
| 34584 ||  || — || September 29, 2000 || Anderson Mesa || LONEOS || EUN || align=right | 4.2 km || 
|-id=585 bgcolor=#fefefe
| 34585 ||  || — || September 30, 2000 || Anderson Mesa || LONEOS || V || align=right | 2.4 km || 
|-id=586 bgcolor=#d6d6d6
| 34586 ||  || — || September 30, 2000 || Anderson Mesa || LONEOS || EOS || align=right | 5.5 km || 
|-id=587 bgcolor=#fefefe
| 34587 ||  || — || September 28, 2000 || Anderson Mesa || LONEOS || — || align=right | 3.8 km || 
|-id=588 bgcolor=#E9E9E9
| 34588 || 2000 TL || — || October 2, 2000 || Fountain Hills || C. W. Juels || EUN || align=right | 4.7 km || 
|-id=589 bgcolor=#E9E9E9
| 34589 Sarahadamo ||  ||  || October 1, 2000 || Socorro || LINEAR || — || align=right | 4.7 km || 
|-id=590 bgcolor=#E9E9E9
| 34590 ||  || — || October 1, 2000 || Socorro || LINEAR || — || align=right | 5.7 km || 
|-id=591 bgcolor=#d6d6d6
| 34591 Saadhahmed ||  ||  || October 1, 2000 || Socorro || LINEAR || THM || align=right | 8.2 km || 
|-id=592 bgcolor=#d6d6d6
| 34592 Amirtharaj ||  ||  || October 1, 2000 || Socorro || LINEAR || — || align=right | 5.1 km || 
|-id=593 bgcolor=#d6d6d6
| 34593 ||  || — || October 1, 2000 || Socorro || LINEAR || EOS || align=right | 6.5 km || 
|-id=594 bgcolor=#d6d6d6
| 34594 Rohanarora ||  ||  || October 2, 2000 || Socorro || LINEAR || — || align=right | 6.7 km || 
|-id=595 bgcolor=#fefefe
| 34595 ||  || — || October 4, 2000 || Socorro || LINEAR || — || align=right | 3.8 km || 
|-id=596 bgcolor=#E9E9E9
| 34596 ||  || — || October 4, 2000 || Bergisch Gladbach || W. Bickel || ADE || align=right | 7.7 km || 
|-id=597 bgcolor=#d6d6d6
| 34597 ||  || — || October 6, 2000 || Anderson Mesa || LONEOS || KOR || align=right | 4.2 km || 
|-id=598 bgcolor=#d6d6d6
| 34598 ||  || — || October 1, 2000 || Socorro || LINEAR || — || align=right | 7.2 km || 
|-id=599 bgcolor=#E9E9E9
| 34599 Burzinbalsara ||  ||  || October 1, 2000 || Socorro || LINEAR || WIT || align=right | 2.6 km || 
|-id=600 bgcolor=#d6d6d6
| 34600 ||  || — || October 1, 2000 || Socorro || LINEAR || — || align=right | 7.4 km || 
|}

34601–34700 

|-bgcolor=#d6d6d6
| 34601 ||  || — || October 1, 2000 || Socorro || LINEAR || EOS || align=right | 5.4 km || 
|-id=602 bgcolor=#d6d6d6
| 34602 ||  || — || October 2, 2000 || Anderson Mesa || LONEOS || EOS || align=right | 7.5 km || 
|-id=603 bgcolor=#d6d6d6
| 34603 ||  || — || October 2, 2000 || Anderson Mesa || LONEOS || — || align=right | 11 km || 
|-id=604 bgcolor=#E9E9E9
| 34604 ||  || — || October 2, 2000 || Anderson Mesa || LONEOS || — || align=right | 4.3 km || 
|-id=605 bgcolor=#E9E9E9
| 34605 || 2000 US || — || October 21, 2000 || Višnjan Observatory || K. Korlević || — || align=right | 6.5 km || 
|-id=606 bgcolor=#E9E9E9
| 34606 || 2000 UT || — || October 21, 2000 || Višnjan Observatory || K. Korlević || HEN || align=right | 3.2 km || 
|-id=607 bgcolor=#d6d6d6
| 34607 ||  || — || October 24, 2000 || Črni Vrh || Črni Vrh || EOS || align=right | 5.3 km || 
|-id=608 bgcolor=#d6d6d6
| 34608 ||  || — || October 24, 2000 || Socorro || LINEAR || EOS || align=right | 5.8 km || 
|-id=609 bgcolor=#d6d6d6
| 34609 ||  || — || October 24, 2000 || Socorro || LINEAR || EOS || align=right | 7.3 km || 
|-id=610 bgcolor=#d6d6d6
| 34610 ||  || — || October 24, 2000 || Socorro || LINEAR || EOS || align=right | 7.9 km || 
|-id=611 bgcolor=#d6d6d6
| 34611 Nacogdoches ||  ||  || October 25, 2000 || Nacogdoches || W. D. Bruton, R. M. Williams || THM || align=right | 8.2 km || 
|-id=612 bgcolor=#d6d6d6
| 34612 ||  || — || October 23, 2000 || Višnjan Observatory || K. Korlević || — || align=right | 9.1 km || 
|-id=613 bgcolor=#FFC2E0
| 34613 ||  || — || October 27, 2000 || Kitt Peak || Spacewatch || AMO +1km || align=right | 2.2 km || 
|-id=614 bgcolor=#E9E9E9
| 34614 ||  || — || October 29, 2000 || Socorro || LINEAR || — || align=right | 5.7 km || 
|-id=615 bgcolor=#E9E9E9
| 34615 ||  || — || October 24, 2000 || Socorro || LINEAR || GEF || align=right | 5.9 km || 
|-id=616 bgcolor=#d6d6d6
| 34616 Andrewbennett ||  ||  || October 24, 2000 || Socorro || LINEAR || — || align=right | 5.7 km || 
|-id=617 bgcolor=#d6d6d6
| 34617 ||  || — || October 24, 2000 || Socorro || LINEAR || — || align=right | 6.1 km || 
|-id=618 bgcolor=#d6d6d6
| 34618 ||  || — || October 24, 2000 || Socorro || LINEAR || — || align=right | 9.6 km || 
|-id=619 bgcolor=#d6d6d6
| 34619 Swagat ||  ||  || October 24, 2000 || Socorro || LINEAR || TEL || align=right | 5.5 km || 
|-id=620 bgcolor=#E9E9E9
| 34620 Edwinbodoni ||  ||  || October 24, 2000 || Socorro || LINEAR || MRX || align=right | 3.9 km || 
|-id=621 bgcolor=#d6d6d6
| 34621 ||  || — || October 24, 2000 || Socorro || LINEAR || TEL || align=right | 4.8 km || 
|-id=622 bgcolor=#d6d6d6
| 34622 ||  || — || October 25, 2000 || Socorro || LINEAR || TEL || align=right | 4.3 km || 
|-id=623 bgcolor=#d6d6d6
| 34623 ||  || — || October 25, 2000 || Socorro || LINEAR || — || align=right | 6.7 km || 
|-id=624 bgcolor=#d6d6d6
| 34624 ||  || — || October 25, 2000 || Socorro || LINEAR || — || align=right | 8.5 km || 
|-id=625 bgcolor=#d6d6d6
| 34625 Bollimpalli ||  ||  || October 25, 2000 || Socorro || LINEAR || — || align=right | 5.0 km || 
|-id=626 bgcolor=#d6d6d6
| 34626 ||  || — || October 25, 2000 || Socorro || LINEAR || — || align=right | 5.6 km || 
|-id=627 bgcolor=#d6d6d6
| 34627 ||  || — || October 25, 2000 || Socorro || LINEAR || — || align=right | 9.5 km || 
|-id=628 bgcolor=#d6d6d6
| 34628 Samaboyea ||  ||  || October 25, 2000 || Socorro || LINEAR || EOS || align=right | 6.1 km || 
|-id=629 bgcolor=#d6d6d6
| 34629 ||  || — || October 30, 2000 || Socorro || LINEAR || EOS || align=right | 4.5 km || 
|-id=630 bgcolor=#E9E9E9
| 34630 ||  || — || October 30, 2000 || Socorro || LINEAR || — || align=right | 7.1 km || 
|-id=631 bgcolor=#d6d6d6
| 34631 ||  || — || October 30, 2000 || Socorro || LINEAR || — || align=right | 15 km || 
|-id=632 bgcolor=#E9E9E9
| 34632 Sarahbroas ||  ||  || October 31, 2000 || Socorro || LINEAR || GEF || align=right | 4.2 km || 
|-id=633 bgcolor=#E9E9E9
| 34633 Megancantwell ||  ||  || November 1, 2000 || Socorro || LINEAR || — || align=right | 8.8 km || 
|-id=634 bgcolor=#E9E9E9
| 34634 Anjalichadha ||  ||  || November 1, 2000 || Socorro || LINEAR || — || align=right | 5.6 km || 
|-id=635 bgcolor=#d6d6d6
| 34635 ||  || — || November 1, 2000 || Socorro || LINEAR || HYG || align=right | 12 km || 
|-id=636 bgcolor=#d6d6d6
| 34636 Lauwingkai ||  ||  || November 1, 2000 || Desert Beaver || W. K. Y. Yeung || — || align=right | 10 km || 
|-id=637 bgcolor=#d6d6d6
| 34637 ||  || — || November 1, 2000 || Socorro || LINEAR || — || align=right | 8.7 km || 
|-id=638 bgcolor=#d6d6d6
| 34638 ||  || — || November 3, 2000 || Socorro || LINEAR || — || align=right | 11 km || 
|-id=639 bgcolor=#E9E9E9
| 34639 ||  || — || November 17, 2000 || Socorro || LINEAR || — || align=right | 4.8 km || 
|-id=640 bgcolor=#E9E9E9
| 34640 ||  || — || November 17, 2000 || Socorro || LINEAR || MAR || align=right | 3.7 km || 
|-id=641 bgcolor=#d6d6d6
| 34641 ||  || — || November 17, 2000 || Socorro || LINEAR || EOS || align=right | 4.3 km || 
|-id=642 bgcolor=#C2FFFF
| 34642 ||  || — || November 18, 2000 || Socorro || LINEAR || L5 || align=right | 33 km || 
|-id=643 bgcolor=#fefefe
| 34643 ||  || — || November 18, 2000 || Socorro || LINEAR || — || align=right | 3.6 km || 
|-id=644 bgcolor=#fefefe
| 34644 Yatinchandar ||  ||  || November 20, 2000 || Socorro || LINEAR || — || align=right | 3.5 km || 
|-id=645 bgcolor=#d6d6d6
| 34645 Vieiramartins ||  ||  || November 20, 2000 || Anderson Mesa || LONEOS || EOS || align=right | 5.6 km || 
|-id=646 bgcolor=#E9E9E9
| 34646 Niaclements ||  ||  || November 21, 2000 || Socorro || LINEAR || AST || align=right | 6.6 km || 
|-id=647 bgcolor=#fefefe
| 34647 Ankushdhawan ||  ||  || November 21, 2000 || Socorro || LINEAR || — || align=right | 4.8 km || 
|-id=648 bgcolor=#E9E9E9
| 34648 ||  || — || November 26, 2000 || Socorro || LINEAR || — || align=right | 3.7 km || 
|-id=649 bgcolor=#d6d6d6
| 34649 ||  || — || November 26, 2000 || Socorro || LINEAR || 7:4 || align=right | 11 km || 
|-id=650 bgcolor=#fefefe
| 34650 Dunkenberger ||  ||  || November 20, 2000 || Socorro || LINEAR || V || align=right | 1.9 km || 
|-id=651 bgcolor=#E9E9E9
| 34651 Edamadaka ||  ||  || November 20, 2000 || Socorro || LINEAR || — || align=right | 3.9 km || 
|-id=652 bgcolor=#E9E9E9
| 34652 Simoneevans ||  ||  || November 20, 2000 || Socorro || LINEAR || — || align=right | 2.6 km || 
|-id=653 bgcolor=#E9E9E9
| 34653 ||  || — || November 21, 2000 || Haleakala || NEAT || EUN || align=right | 5.1 km || 
|-id=654 bgcolor=#d6d6d6
| 34654 ||  || — || November 22, 2000 || Haleakala || NEAT || — || align=right | 6.0 km || 
|-id=655 bgcolor=#d6d6d6
| 34655 ||  || — || November 29, 2000 || Haleakala || NEAT || — || align=right | 5.9 km || 
|-id=656 bgcolor=#E9E9E9
| 34656 ||  || — || November 28, 2000 || Socorro || LINEAR || EUN || align=right | 4.1 km || 
|-id=657 bgcolor=#d6d6d6
| 34657 ||  || — || November 30, 2000 || Socorro || LINEAR || EOS || align=right | 6.0 km || 
|-id=658 bgcolor=#E9E9E9
| 34658 ||  || — || November 30, 2000 || Haleakala || NEAT || — || align=right | 7.1 km || 
|-id=659 bgcolor=#d6d6d6
| 34659 ||  || — || November 20, 2000 || Anderson Mesa || LONEOS || — || align=right | 8.5 km || 
|-id=660 bgcolor=#d6d6d6
| 34660 ||  || — || November 20, 2000 || Anderson Mesa || LONEOS || URS || align=right | 6.1 km || 
|-id=661 bgcolor=#d6d6d6
| 34661 ||  || — || November 23, 2000 || Haleakala || NEAT || EOS || align=right | 6.0 km || 
|-id=662 bgcolor=#E9E9E9
| 34662 ||  || — || November 25, 2000 || Socorro || LINEAR || — || align=right | 2.4 km || 
|-id=663 bgcolor=#d6d6d6
| 34663 ||  || — || November 26, 2000 || Socorro || LINEAR || — || align=right | 8.0 km || 
|-id=664 bgcolor=#E9E9E9
| 34664 ||  || — || November 18, 2000 || Socorro || LINEAR || MAR || align=right | 4.3 km || 
|-id=665 bgcolor=#E9E9E9
| 34665 ||  || — || November 29, 2000 || Anderson Mesa || LONEOS || — || align=right | 4.0 km || 
|-id=666 bgcolor=#d6d6d6
| 34666 Bohyunsan ||  ||  || December 4, 2000 || Bohyunsan || Y.-B. Jeon, B.-C. Lee || THM || align=right | 5.7 km || 
|-id=667 bgcolor=#d6d6d6
| 34667 ||  || — || December 4, 2000 || Socorro || LINEAR || — || align=right | 11 km || 
|-id=668 bgcolor=#d6d6d6
| 34668 ||  || — || December 5, 2000 || Socorro || LINEAR || — || align=right | 19 km || 
|-id=669 bgcolor=#d6d6d6
| 34669 ||  || — || December 16, 2000 || Socorro || LINEAR || — || align=right | 16 km || 
|-id=670 bgcolor=#d6d6d6
| 34670 ||  || — || December 19, 2000 || Haleakala || NEAT || ALA || align=right | 10 km || 
|-id=671 bgcolor=#fefefe
| 34671 ||  || — || December 21, 2000 || Socorro || LINEAR || — || align=right | 2.7 km || 
|-id=672 bgcolor=#d6d6d6
| 34672 ||  || — || December 30, 2000 || Socorro || LINEAR || EOS || align=right | 7.1 km || 
|-id=673 bgcolor=#d6d6d6
| 34673 ||  || — || December 30, 2000 || Socorro || LINEAR || — || align=right | 7.1 km || 
|-id=674 bgcolor=#d6d6d6
| 34674 ||  || — || December 30, 2000 || Socorro || LINEAR || — || align=right | 16 km || 
|-id=675 bgcolor=#fefefe
| 34675 Feldbush ||  ||  || December 30, 2000 || Socorro || LINEAR || NYS || align=right | 2.3 km || 
|-id=676 bgcolor=#d6d6d6
| 34676 ||  || — || December 29, 2000 || Haleakala || NEAT || — || align=right | 9.3 km || 
|-id=677 bgcolor=#d6d6d6
| 34677 ||  || — || December 17, 2000 || Anderson Mesa || LONEOS || — || align=right | 5.8 km || 
|-id=678 bgcolor=#fefefe
| 34678 Hansenestruch ||  ||  || January 4, 2001 || Socorro || LINEAR || — || align=right | 4.3 km || 
|-id=679 bgcolor=#E9E9E9
| 34679 ||  || — || January 19, 2001 || Socorro || LINEAR || — || align=right | 3.8 km || 
|-id=680 bgcolor=#E9E9E9
| 34680 Anahumphrey ||  ||  || January 20, 2001 || Socorro || LINEAR || — || align=right | 5.8 km || 
|-id=681 bgcolor=#fefefe
| 34681 Suhahussain ||  ||  || January 20, 2001 || Socorro || LINEAR || V || align=right | 1.7 km || 
|-id=682 bgcolor=#E9E9E9
| 34682 ||  || — || January 19, 2001 || Socorro || LINEAR || — || align=right | 4.3 km || 
|-id=683 bgcolor=#E9E9E9
| 34683 ||  || — || February 1, 2001 || Socorro || LINEAR || — || align=right | 4.0 km || 
|-id=684 bgcolor=#C2FFFF
| 34684 ||  || — || February 2, 2001 || Anderson Mesa || LONEOS || L4 || align=right | 23 km || 
|-id=685 bgcolor=#E9E9E9
| 34685 ||  || — || March 3, 2001 || Socorro || LINEAR || EUN || align=right | 2.8 km || 
|-id=686 bgcolor=#E9E9E9
| 34686 ||  || — || March 18, 2001 || Socorro || LINEAR || — || align=right | 3.4 km || 
|-id=687 bgcolor=#E9E9E9
| 34687 Isahaku ||  ||  || March 19, 2001 || Socorro || LINEAR || — || align=right | 3.5 km || 
|-id=688 bgcolor=#fefefe
| 34688 ||  || — || March 20, 2001 || Haleakala || NEAT || — || align=right | 6.5 km || 
|-id=689 bgcolor=#E9E9E9
| 34689 Flewelling ||  ||  || March 24, 2001 || Anderson Mesa || LONEOS || JUN || align=right | 7.3 km || 
|-id=690 bgcolor=#d6d6d6
| 34690 ||  || — || March 29, 2001 || Haleakala || NEAT || — || align=right | 5.2 km || 
|-id=691 bgcolor=#d6d6d6
| 34691 ||  || — || May 26, 2001 || Socorro || LINEAR || URS || align=right | 12 km || 
|-id=692 bgcolor=#fefefe
| 34692 ||  || — || May 17, 2001 || Haleakala || NEAT || — || align=right | 3.5 km || 
|-id=693 bgcolor=#E9E9E9
| 34693 ||  || — || June 15, 2001 || Socorro || LINEAR || — || align=right | 2.3 km || 
|-id=694 bgcolor=#fefefe
| 34694 ||  || — || June 23, 2001 || Palomar || NEAT || — || align=right | 2.2 km || 
|-id=695 bgcolor=#fefefe
| 34695 ||  || — || July 14, 2001 || Palomar || NEAT || NYS || align=right | 4.8 km || 
|-id=696 bgcolor=#E9E9E9
| 34696 Risoldi ||  ||  || July 21, 2001 || San Marcello || A. Boattini, M. Tombelli || — || align=right | 4.5 km || 
|-id=697 bgcolor=#E9E9E9
| 34697 ||  || — || July 20, 2001 || Socorro || LINEAR || — || align=right | 5.1 km || 
|-id=698 bgcolor=#d6d6d6
| 34698 ||  || — || July 21, 2001 || Anderson Mesa || LONEOS || ALA || align=right | 8.3 km || 
|-id=699 bgcolor=#d6d6d6
| 34699 ||  || — || July 18, 2001 || Haleakala || NEAT || EOS || align=right | 4.2 km || 
|-id=700 bgcolor=#d6d6d6
| 34700 ||  || — || July 16, 2001 || Anderson Mesa || LONEOS || — || align=right | 9.7 km || 
|}

34701–34800 

|-bgcolor=#E9E9E9
| 34701 ||  || — || July 19, 2001 || Palomar || NEAT || — || align=right | 5.4 km || 
|-id=702 bgcolor=#fefefe
| 34702 ||  || — || July 20, 2001 || Anderson Mesa || LONEOS || V || align=right | 3.4 km || 
|-id=703 bgcolor=#fefefe
| 34703 ||  || — || July 16, 2001 || Anderson Mesa || LONEOS || NYS || align=right | 4.0 km || 
|-id=704 bgcolor=#E9E9E9
| 34704 ||  || — || July 29, 2001 || Socorro || LINEAR || — || align=right | 11 km || 
|-id=705 bgcolor=#E9E9E9
| 34705 ||  || — || July 29, 2001 || Socorro || LINEAR || EUN || align=right | 5.4 km || 
|-id=706 bgcolor=#FA8072
| 34706 ||  || — || July 27, 2001 || Palomar || NEAT || moon || align=right | 3.0 km || 
|-id=707 bgcolor=#fefefe
| 34707 ||  || — || July 28, 2001 || Haleakala || NEAT || — || align=right | 3.1 km || 
|-id=708 bgcolor=#fefefe
| 34708 Grasset ||  ||  || July 29, 2001 || Palomar || NEAT || PHO || align=right | 4.7 km || 
|-id=709 bgcolor=#E9E9E9
| 34709 ||  || — || July 25, 2001 || Haleakala || NEAT || — || align=right | 7.1 km || 
|-id=710 bgcolor=#d6d6d6
| 34710 ||  || — || July 25, 2001 || Haleakala || NEAT || EOS || align=right | 6.6 km || 
|-id=711 bgcolor=#d6d6d6
| 34711 ||  || — || July 25, 2001 || Haleakala || NEAT || EOS || align=right | 9.8 km || 
|-id=712 bgcolor=#d6d6d6
| 34712 ||  || — || July 29, 2001 || Anderson Mesa || LONEOS || — || align=right | 11 km || 
|-id=713 bgcolor=#E9E9E9
| 34713 ||  || — || July 29, 2001 || Anderson Mesa || LONEOS || GEF || align=right | 9.6 km || 
|-id=714 bgcolor=#E9E9E9
| 34714 ||  || — || July 28, 2001 || Anderson Mesa || LONEOS || — || align=right | 4.9 km || 
|-id=715 bgcolor=#d6d6d6
| 34715 ||  || — || August 12, 2001 || Palomar || NEAT || — || align=right | 6.4 km || 
|-id=716 bgcolor=#E9E9E9
| 34716 Guzzo ||  ||  || August 14, 2001 || San Marcello || A. Boattini, L. Tesi || — || align=right | 2.4 km || 
|-id=717 bgcolor=#fefefe
| 34717 Mirkovilli ||  ||  || August 14, 2001 || San Marcello || A. Boattini, L. Tesi || — || align=right | 2.6 km || 
|-id=718 bgcolor=#d6d6d6
| 34718 Cantagalli ||  ||  || August 14, 2001 || San Marcello || L. Tesi, A. Boattini || — || align=right | 7.9 km || 
|-id=719 bgcolor=#d6d6d6
| 34719 ||  || — || August 13, 2001 || Haleakala || NEAT || URS || align=right | 12 km || 
|-id=720 bgcolor=#d6d6d6
| 34720 ||  || — || August 14, 2001 || Haleakala || NEAT || KOR || align=right | 3.2 km || 
|-id=721 bgcolor=#d6d6d6
| 34721 ||  || — || August 16, 2001 || Socorro || LINEAR || — || align=right | 8.7 km || 
|-id=722 bgcolor=#fefefe
| 34722 ||  || — || August 16, 2001 || Socorro || LINEAR || NYS || align=right | 1.3 km || 
|-id=723 bgcolor=#d6d6d6
| 34723 ||  || — || August 16, 2001 || Socorro || LINEAR || — || align=right | 9.9 km || 
|-id=724 bgcolor=#fefefe
| 34724 ||  || — || August 16, 2001 || Socorro || LINEAR || — || align=right | 1.6 km || 
|-id=725 bgcolor=#E9E9E9
| 34725 ||  || — || August 16, 2001 || Socorro || LINEAR || MRX || align=right | 4.1 km || 
|-id=726 bgcolor=#d6d6d6
| 34726 ||  || — || August 16, 2001 || Socorro || LINEAR || ALA || align=right | 18 km || 
|-id=727 bgcolor=#d6d6d6
| 34727 ||  || — || August 16, 2001 || Socorro || LINEAR || THM || align=right | 8.7 km || 
|-id=728 bgcolor=#E9E9E9
| 34728 ||  || — || August 16, 2001 || Socorro || LINEAR || PAD || align=right | 9.7 km || 
|-id=729 bgcolor=#d6d6d6
| 34729 Natalianoel ||  ||  || August 16, 2001 || Socorro || LINEAR || KOR || align=right | 3.9 km || 
|-id=730 bgcolor=#d6d6d6
| 34730 Rainajain ||  ||  || August 16, 2001 || Socorro || LINEAR || THM || align=right | 4.1 km || 
|-id=731 bgcolor=#E9E9E9
| 34731 Ronitjain ||  ||  || August 16, 2001 || Socorro || LINEAR || — || align=right | 4.5 km || 
|-id=732 bgcolor=#fefefe
| 34732 ||  || — || August 16, 2001 || Socorro || LINEAR || — || align=right | 2.8 km || 
|-id=733 bgcolor=#fefefe
| 34733 ||  || — || August 16, 2001 || Socorro || LINEAR || NYS || align=right | 1.8 km || 
|-id=734 bgcolor=#d6d6d6
| 34734 ||  || — || August 16, 2001 || Socorro || LINEAR || — || align=right | 6.9 km || 
|-id=735 bgcolor=#d6d6d6
| 34735 ||  || — || August 17, 2001 || Socorro || LINEAR || — || align=right | 8.7 km || 
|-id=736 bgcolor=#d6d6d6
| 34736 ||  || — || August 17, 2001 || Socorro || LINEAR || — || align=right | 5.5 km || 
|-id=737 bgcolor=#fefefe
| 34737 Parkerjou ||  ||  || August 18, 2001 || Socorro || LINEAR || V || align=right | 2.4 km || 
|-id=738 bgcolor=#fefefe
| 34738 Hulbert ||  ||  || August 20, 2001 || Terre Haute || C. Wolfe || — || align=right | 2.1 km || 
|-id=739 bgcolor=#d6d6d6
| 34739 Maryalice ||  ||  || August 16, 2001 || Socorro || LINEAR || THM || align=right | 7.2 km || 
|-id=740 bgcolor=#E9E9E9
| 34740 Emmakeeler ||  ||  || August 16, 2001 || Socorro || LINEAR || — || align=right | 5.2 km || 
|-id=741 bgcolor=#fefefe
| 34741 Alyssakeirn ||  ||  || August 16, 2001 || Socorro || LINEAR || NYS || align=right | 2.9 km || 
|-id=742 bgcolor=#E9E9E9
| 34742 ||  || — || August 16, 2001 || Socorro || LINEAR || ADE || align=right | 7.2 km || 
|-id=743 bgcolor=#d6d6d6
| 34743 Kollipara ||  ||  || August 16, 2001 || Socorro || LINEAR || THM || align=right | 6.0 km || 
|-id=744 bgcolor=#E9E9E9
| 34744 ||  || — || August 16, 2001 || Palomar || NEAT || MAR || align=right | 4.7 km || 
|-id=745 bgcolor=#fefefe
| 34745 ||  || — || August 22, 2001 || Socorro || LINEAR || H || align=right | 1.6 km || 
|-id=746 bgcolor=#C2FFFF
| 34746 Thoon ||  ||  || August 22, 2001 || Socorro || LINEAR || L5 || align=right | 62 km || 
|-id=747 bgcolor=#d6d6d6
| 34747 ||  || — || August 19, 2001 || Socorro || LINEAR || — || align=right | 13 km || 
|-id=748 bgcolor=#d6d6d6
| 34748 ||  || — || August 22, 2001 || Socorro || LINEAR || ALA || align=right | 12 km || 
|-id=749 bgcolor=#d6d6d6
| 34749 ||  || — || August 22, 2001 || Socorro || LINEAR || HYG || align=right | 7.5 km || 
|-id=750 bgcolor=#d6d6d6
| 34750 ||  || — || August 17, 2001 || Socorro || LINEAR || 7:4 || align=right | 11 km || 
|-id=751 bgcolor=#fefefe
| 34751 ||  || — || August 22, 2001 || Haleakala || NEAT || — || align=right | 4.1 km || 
|-id=752 bgcolor=#fefefe
| 34752 Venkatkrishnan ||  ||  || August 23, 2001 || Socorro || LINEAR || FLO || align=right | 3.3 km || 
|-id=753 bgcolor=#fefefe
| 34753 Zdeněkmatyáš ||  ||  || August 24, 2001 || Ondřejov || P. Pravec, P. Kušnirák || — || align=right | 1.5 km || 
|-id=754 bgcolor=#E9E9E9
| 34754 ||  || — || August 25, 2001 || Fountain Hills || C. W. Juels || — || align=right | 5.0 km || 
|-id=755 bgcolor=#FA8072
| 34755 ||  || — || August 19, 2001 || Socorro || LINEAR || — || align=right | 3.8 km || 
|-id=756 bgcolor=#E9E9E9
| 34756 ||  || — || August 22, 2001 || Socorro || LINEAR || — || align=right | 4.1 km || 
|-id=757 bgcolor=#E9E9E9
| 34757 ||  || — || August 22, 2001 || Socorro || LINEAR || ADE || align=right | 8.1 km || 
|-id=758 bgcolor=#E9E9E9
| 34758 ||  || — || August 20, 2001 || Palomar || NEAT || — || align=right | 7.1 km || 
|-id=759 bgcolor=#FA8072
| 34759 ||  || — || August 23, 2001 || Socorro || LINEAR || — || align=right | 8.8 km || 
|-id=760 bgcolor=#E9E9E9
| 34760 Ciccone ||  ||  || August 26, 2001 || Desert Eagle || W. K. Y. Yeung || — || align=right | 5.7 km || 
|-id=761 bgcolor=#fefefe
| 34761 ||  || — || August 28, 2001 || Palomar || NEAT || FLO || align=right | 2.3 km || 
|-id=762 bgcolor=#fefefe
| 34762 ||  || — || August 25, 2001 || Palomar || NEAT || NYS || align=right | 1.6 km || 
|-id=763 bgcolor=#E9E9E9
| 34763 ||  || — || August 22, 2001 || Socorro || LINEAR || — || align=right | 4.9 km || 
|-id=764 bgcolor=#d6d6d6
| 34764 ||  || — || August 22, 2001 || Socorro || LINEAR || — || align=right | 6.3 km || 
|-id=765 bgcolor=#E9E9E9
| 34765 ||  || — || August 22, 2001 || Socorro || LINEAR || PAD || align=right | 7.6 km || 
|-id=766 bgcolor=#fefefe
| 34766 Everettkroll ||  ||  || August 22, 2001 || Socorro || LINEAR || — || align=right | 2.6 km || 
|-id=767 bgcolor=#E9E9E9
| 34767 ||  || — || August 22, 2001 || Palomar || NEAT || GEF || align=right | 6.4 km || 
|-id=768 bgcolor=#fefefe
| 34768 ||  || — || August 24, 2001 || Palomar || NEAT || FLO || align=right | 1.9 km || 
|-id=769 bgcolor=#fefefe
| 34769 Remilabeille ||  ||  || August 24, 2001 || Socorro || LINEAR || NYS || align=right | 2.2 km || 
|-id=770 bgcolor=#d6d6d6
| 34770 Leyendecker ||  ||  || August 24, 2001 || Socorro || LINEAR || — || align=right | 5.9 km || 
|-id=771 bgcolor=#fefefe
| 34771 Lilauren ||  ||  || August 25, 2001 || Socorro || LINEAR || NYS || align=right | 2.1 km || 
|-id=772 bgcolor=#E9E9E9
| 34772 Lirachel ||  ||  || August 25, 2001 || Socorro || LINEAR || — || align=right | 2.6 km || 
|-id=773 bgcolor=#d6d6d6
| 34773 ||  || — || August 25, 2001 || Socorro || LINEAR || — || align=right | 7.9 km || 
|-id=774 bgcolor=#d6d6d6
| 34774 ||  || — || August 25, 2001 || Socorro || LINEAR || — || align=right | 13 km || 
|-id=775 bgcolor=#d6d6d6
| 34775 ||  || — || August 25, 2001 || Anderson Mesa || LONEOS || — || align=right | 8.4 km || 
|-id=776 bgcolor=#E9E9E9
| 34776 ||  || — || August 20, 2001 || Palomar || NEAT || — || align=right | 3.8 km || 
|-id=777 bgcolor=#d6d6d6
| 34777 || 2001 RH || — || September 6, 2001 || Socorro || LINEAR || Tj (2.94) || align=right | 16 km || 
|-id=778 bgcolor=#E9E9E9
| 34778 Huhunglick ||  ||  || September 10, 2001 || Desert Eagle || W. K. Y. Yeung || — || align=right | 5.4 km || 
|-id=779 bgcolor=#fefefe
| 34779 Chungchiyung ||  ||  || September 10, 2001 || Desert Eagle || W. K. Y. Yeung || — || align=right | 3.5 km || 
|-id=780 bgcolor=#fefefe
| 34780 Nikhillohe ||  ||  || September 12, 2001 || Socorro || LINEAR || FLO || align=right | 2.0 km || 
|-id=781 bgcolor=#d6d6d6
| 34781 ||  || — || September 12, 2001 || Socorro || LINEAR || ALA || align=right | 12 km || 
|-id=782 bgcolor=#E9E9E9
| 34782 ||  || — || September 10, 2001 || Socorro || LINEAR || — || align=right | 4.6 km || 
|-id=783 bgcolor=#d6d6d6
| 34783 ||  || — || September 10, 2001 || Socorro || LINEAR || THM || align=right | 8.4 km || 
|-id=784 bgcolor=#fefefe
| 34784 Lukelong ||  ||  || September 10, 2001 || Socorro || LINEAR || V || align=right | 2.6 km || 
|-id=785 bgcolor=#C2FFFF
| 34785 ||  || — || September 11, 2001 || Anderson Mesa || LONEOS || L5 || align=right | 29 km || 
|-id=786 bgcolor=#d6d6d6
| 34786 ||  || — || September 11, 2001 || Anderson Mesa || LONEOS || KOR || align=right | 4.3 km || 
|-id=787 bgcolor=#fefefe
| 34787 ||  || — || September 12, 2001 || Socorro || LINEAR || NYS || align=right | 1.6 km || 
|-id=788 bgcolor=#fefefe
| 34788 Samuellossef ||  ||  || September 12, 2001 || Socorro || LINEAR || — || align=right | 1.9 km || 
|-id=789 bgcolor=#fefefe
| 34789 ||  || — || September 17, 2001 || Desert Eagle || W. K. Y. Yeung || — || align=right | 2.7 km || 
|-id=790 bgcolor=#d6d6d6
| 34790 ||  || — || September 16, 2001 || Palomar || NEAT || EOS || align=right | 6.5 km || 
|-id=791 bgcolor=#E9E9E9
| 34791 Ericcraine ||  ||  || September 18, 2001 || Goodricke-Pigott || R. A. Tucker || — || align=right | 3.0 km || 
|-id=792 bgcolor=#fefefe
| 34792 ||  || — || September 20, 2001 || Desert Eagle || W. K. Y. Yeung || V || align=right | 1.9 km || 
|-id=793 bgcolor=#d6d6d6
| 34793 ||  || — || September 16, 2001 || Socorro || LINEAR || — || align=right | 10 km || 
|-id=794 bgcolor=#d6d6d6
| 34794 ||  || — || September 16, 2001 || Socorro || LINEAR || — || align=right | 7.7 km || 
|-id=795 bgcolor=#d6d6d6
| 34795 ||  || — || September 16, 2001 || Socorro || LINEAR || THM || align=right | 8.6 km || 
|-id=796 bgcolor=#d6d6d6
| 34796 Rheamalhotra ||  ||  || September 16, 2001 || Socorro || LINEAR || — || align=right | 6.6 km || 
|-id=797 bgcolor=#E9E9E9
| 34797 Alicemartynova ||  ||  || September 16, 2001 || Socorro || LINEAR || HEN || align=right | 3.0 km || 
|-id=798 bgcolor=#fefefe
| 34798 ||  || — || September 16, 2001 || Socorro || LINEAR || FLO || align=right | 1.3 km || 
|-id=799 bgcolor=#E9E9E9
| 34799 Mcdonaldboyer ||  ||  || September 16, 2001 || Socorro || LINEAR || — || align=right | 2.0 km || 
|-id=800 bgcolor=#fefefe
| 34800 Evanmeade ||  ||  || September 17, 2001 || Socorro || LINEAR || — || align=right | 4.1 km || 
|}

34801–34900 

|-bgcolor=#d6d6d6
| 34801 ||  || — || September 17, 2001 || Socorro || LINEAR || — || align=right | 9.0 km || 
|-id=802 bgcolor=#E9E9E9
| 34802 Anwesha ||  ||  || September 17, 2001 || Socorro || LINEAR || — || align=right | 2.5 km || 
|-id=803 bgcolor=#d6d6d6
| 34803 ||  || — || September 17, 2001 || Socorro || LINEAR || — || align=right | 11 km || 
|-id=804 bgcolor=#fefefe
| 34804 ||  || — || September 17, 2001 || Socorro || LINEAR || SVE || align=right | 5.2 km || 
|-id=805 bgcolor=#d6d6d6
| 34805 ||  || — || September 17, 2001 || Socorro || LINEAR || — || align=right | 8.1 km || 
|-id=806 bgcolor=#fefefe
| 34806 ||  || — || September 17, 2001 || Socorro || LINEAR || FLO || align=right | 2.2 km || 
|-id=807 bgcolor=#fefefe
| 34807 ||  || — || September 17, 2001 || Socorro || LINEAR || — || align=right | 3.3 km || 
|-id=808 bgcolor=#d6d6d6
| 34808 ||  || — || September 19, 2001 || Anderson Mesa || LONEOS || — || align=right | 5.9 km || 
|-id=809 bgcolor=#d6d6d6
| 34809 ||  || — || September 19, 2001 || Anderson Mesa || LONEOS || EOS || align=right | 6.1 km || 
|-id=810 bgcolor=#d6d6d6
| 34810 ||  || — || September 20, 2001 || Socorro || LINEAR || EOS || align=right | 4.8 km || 
|-id=811 bgcolor=#E9E9E9
| 34811 ||  || — || September 20, 2001 || Socorro || LINEAR || — || align=right | 4.2 km || 
|-id=812 bgcolor=#E9E9E9
| 34812 ||  || — || September 20, 2001 || Socorro || LINEAR || EUN || align=right | 6.6 km || 
|-id=813 bgcolor=#E9E9E9
| 34813 ||  || — || September 20, 2001 || Socorro || LINEAR || EUN || align=right | 5.7 km || 
|-id=814 bgcolor=#E9E9E9
| 34814 Muthukumar ||  ||  || September 20, 2001 || Socorro || LINEAR || — || align=right | 8.6 km || 
|-id=815 bgcolor=#E9E9E9
| 34815 ||  || — || September 20, 2001 || Desert Eagle || W. K. Y. Yeung || — || align=right | 3.0 km || 
|-id=816 bgcolor=#E9E9E9
| 34816 ||  || — || September 20, 2001 || Desert Eagle || W. K. Y. Yeung || — || align=right | 2.8 km || 
|-id=817 bgcolor=#FA8072
| 34817 Shiominemoto ||  ||  || September 21, 2001 || Bisei SG Center || BATTeRS || H || align=right | 4.4 km || 
|-id=818 bgcolor=#d6d6d6
| 34818 ||  || — || September 16, 2001 || Socorro || LINEAR || HYG || align=right | 8.0 km || 
|-id=819 bgcolor=#E9E9E9
| 34819 Nandininaidu ||  ||  || September 16, 2001 || Socorro || LINEAR || PAD || align=right | 2.8 km || 
|-id=820 bgcolor=#fefefe
| 34820 ||  || — || September 16, 2001 || Socorro || LINEAR || FLO || align=right | 1.4 km || 
|-id=821 bgcolor=#E9E9E9
| 34821 Oyetunji ||  ||  || September 16, 2001 || Socorro || LINEAR || DOR || align=right | 7.1 km || 
|-id=822 bgcolor=#E9E9E9
| 34822 Dhruvikparikh ||  ||  || September 16, 2001 || Socorro || LINEAR || — || align=right | 5.3 km || 
|-id=823 bgcolor=#fefefe
| 34823 Lillipetersen ||  ||  || September 17, 2001 || Socorro || LINEAR || — || align=right | 4.4 km || 
|-id=824 bgcolor=#d6d6d6
| 34824 ||  || — || September 17, 2001 || Socorro || LINEAR || — || align=right | 9.5 km || 
|-id=825 bgcolor=#d6d6d6
| 34825 ||  || — || September 17, 2001 || Socorro || LINEAR || — || align=right | 13 km || 
|-id=826 bgcolor=#fefefe
| 34826 ||  || — || September 17, 2001 || Socorro || LINEAR || — || align=right | 1.7 km || 
|-id=827 bgcolor=#d6d6d6
| 34827 ||  || — || September 17, 2001 || Socorro || LINEAR || — || align=right | 5.4 km || 
|-id=828 bgcolor=#d6d6d6
| 34828 Ishapuri ||  ||  || September 19, 2001 || Socorro || LINEAR || HYG || align=right | 8.3 km || 
|-id=829 bgcolor=#fefefe
| 34829 ||  || — || September 19, 2001 || Socorro || LINEAR || — || align=right | 1.7 km || 
|-id=830 bgcolor=#d6d6d6
| 34830 Annaquinlan ||  ||  || September 19, 2001 || Socorro || LINEAR || — || align=right | 5.4 km || 
|-id=831 bgcolor=#fefefe
| 34831 Krithikramesh ||  ||  || September 19, 2001 || Socorro || LINEAR || FLO || align=right | 2.5 km || 
|-id=832 bgcolor=#E9E9E9
| 34832 ||  || — || September 19, 2001 || Socorro || LINEAR || — || align=right | 1.5 km || 
|-id=833 bgcolor=#fefefe
| 34833 ||  || — || September 19, 2001 || Socorro || LINEAR || — || align=right | 2.0 km || 
|-id=834 bgcolor=#d6d6d6
| 34834 ||  || — || September 19, 2001 || Socorro || LINEAR || 7:4 || align=right | 10 km || 
|-id=835 bgcolor=#C2FFFF
| 34835 ||  || — || September 19, 2001 || Socorro || LINEAR || L5 || align=right | 16 km || 
|-id=836 bgcolor=#d6d6d6
| 34836 Ronakroy ||  ||  || September 19, 2001 || Socorro || LINEAR || — || align=right | 6.0 km || 
|-id=837 bgcolor=#fefefe
| 34837 Berilsaygin ||  ||  || September 21, 2001 || Socorro || LINEAR || FLO || align=right | 2.4 km || 
|-id=838 bgcolor=#d6d6d6
| 34838 Lazowski ||  ||  || September 21, 2001 || Desert Eagle || W. K. Y. Yeung || VER || align=right | 9.6 km || 
|-id=839 bgcolor=#d6d6d6
| 34839 ||  || — || September 25, 2001 || Fountain Hills || C. W. Juels, P. R. Holvorcem || EOS || align=right | 8.8 km || 
|-id=840 bgcolor=#E9E9E9
| 34840 ||  || — || September 25, 2001 || Desert Eagle || W. K. Y. Yeung || — || align=right | 6.5 km || 
|-id=841 bgcolor=#fefefe
| 34841 ||  || — || September 25, 2001 || Desert Eagle || W. K. Y. Yeung || — || align=right | 2.4 km || 
|-id=842 bgcolor=#d6d6d6
| 34842 ||  || — || September 16, 2001 || Palomar || NEAT || — || align=right | 7.6 km || 
|-id=843 bgcolor=#E9E9E9
| 34843 ||  || — || September 21, 2001 || Palomar || NEAT || — || align=right | 3.1 km || 
|-id=844 bgcolor=#fefefe
| 34844 Malavshah ||  ||  || September 27, 2001 || Socorro || LINEAR || NYS || align=right | 2.3 km || 
|-id=845 bgcolor=#d6d6d6
| 34845 ||  || — || September 21, 2001 || Anderson Mesa || LONEOS || — || align=right | 11 km || 
|-id=846 bgcolor=#d6d6d6
| 34846 Vincent ||  ||  || September 22, 2001 || Anderson Mesa || LONEOS || EUP || align=right | 9.8 km || 
|-id=847 bgcolor=#E9E9E9
| 34847 ||  || — || September 21, 2001 || Palomar || NEAT || EUN || align=right | 3.8 km || 
|-id=848 bgcolor=#d6d6d6
| 34848 ||  || — || September 27, 2001 || Palomar || NEAT || ALA || align=right | 12 km || 
|-id=849 bgcolor=#E9E9E9
| 34849 ||  || — || September 27, 2001 || Palomar || NEAT || EUN || align=right | 5.5 km || 
|-id=850 bgcolor=#d6d6d6
| 34850 ||  || — || October 9, 2001 || Socorro || LINEAR || SYL7:4 || align=right | 13 km || 
|-id=851 bgcolor=#fefefe
| 34851 ||  || — || October 9, 2001 || Socorro || LINEAR || — || align=right | 2.4 km || 
|-id=852 bgcolor=#fefefe
| 34852 Shteyman ||  ||  || October 13, 2001 || Socorro || LINEAR || — || align=right | 2.5 km || 
|-id=853 bgcolor=#E9E9E9
| 34853 ||  || — || October 11, 2001 || Socorro || LINEAR || — || align=right | 8.3 km || 
|-id=854 bgcolor=#d6d6d6
| 34854 Paquifrutos ||  ||  || October 13, 2001 || Pla D'Arguines || R. Ferrando || TIR || align=right | 6.5 km || 
|-id=855 bgcolor=#fefefe
| 34855 Annaspektor ||  ||  || October 14, 2001 || Socorro || LINEAR || V || align=right | 1.8 km || 
|-id=856 bgcolor=#fefefe
| 34856 Savithas ||  ||  || October 14, 2001 || Socorro || LINEAR || V || align=right | 2.5 km || 
|-id=857 bgcolor=#fefefe
| 34857 Sutaria ||  ||  || October 14, 2001 || Socorro || LINEAR || KLI || align=right | 5.1 km || 
|-id=858 bgcolor=#fefefe
| 34858 ||  || — || October 14, 2001 || Socorro || LINEAR || — || align=right | 3.2 km || 
|-id=859 bgcolor=#E9E9E9
| 34859 ||  || — || October 15, 2001 || Desert Eagle || W. K. Y. Yeung || — || align=right | 6.3 km || 
|-id=860 bgcolor=#d6d6d6
| 34860 ||  || — || October 13, 2001 || Socorro || LINEAR || VER || align=right | 8.2 km || 
|-id=861 bgcolor=#E9E9E9
| 34861 ||  || — || October 13, 2001 || Socorro || LINEAR || — || align=right | 5.3 km || 
|-id=862 bgcolor=#d6d6d6
| 34862 Utkarshtandon ||  ||  || October 13, 2001 || Socorro || LINEAR || — || align=right | 9.1 km || 
|-id=863 bgcolor=#fefefe
| 34863 Lientang ||  ||  || October 13, 2001 || Socorro || LINEAR || — || align=right | 4.6 km || 
|-id=864 bgcolor=#d6d6d6
| 34864 ||  || — || October 14, 2001 || Socorro || LINEAR || EOS || align=right | 7.0 km || 
|-id=865 bgcolor=#d6d6d6
| 34865 ||  || — || October 14, 2001 || Socorro || LINEAR || — || align=right | 12 km || 
|-id=866 bgcolor=#E9E9E9
| 34866 ||  || — || October 15, 2001 || Socorro || LINEAR || — || align=right | 5.5 km || 
|-id=867 bgcolor=#E9E9E9
| 34867 ||  || — || October 15, 2001 || Socorro || LINEAR || ADE || align=right | 11 km || 
|-id=868 bgcolor=#d6d6d6
| 34868 ||  || — || October 13, 2001 || Palomar || NEAT || EOS || align=right | 9.3 km || 
|-id=869 bgcolor=#fefefe
| 34869 ||  || — || October 15, 2001 || Socorro || LINEAR || — || align=right | 2.7 km || 
|-id=870 bgcolor=#d6d6d6
| 34870 ||  || — || October 15, 2001 || Palomar || NEAT || — || align=right | 4.5 km || 
|-id=871 bgcolor=#fefefe
| 34871 ||  || — || October 18, 2001 || Desert Eagle || W. K. Y. Yeung || — || align=right | 3.1 km || 
|-id=872 bgcolor=#E9E9E9
| 34872 ||  || — || October 20, 2001 || Farpoint || G. Hug || MAR || align=right | 3.1 km || 
|-id=873 bgcolor=#E9E9E9
| 34873 ||  || — || October 20, 2001 || Ametlla de Mar || J. Nomen || EUN || align=right | 6.3 km || 
|-id=874 bgcolor=#d6d6d6
| 34874 Tolwani ||  ||  || October 17, 2001 || Socorro || LINEAR || — || align=right | 2.7 km || 
|-id=875 bgcolor=#E9E9E9
| 34875 ||  || — || October 17, 2001 || Socorro || LINEAR || — || align=right | 9.2 km || 
|-id=876 bgcolor=#fefefe
| 34876 Sofiatomov ||  ||  || October 16, 2001 || Socorro || LINEAR || V || align=right | 1.8 km || 
|-id=877 bgcolor=#fefefe
| 34877 Tremsin ||  ||  || October 16, 2001 || Socorro || LINEAR || V || align=right | 1.5 km || 
|-id=878 bgcolor=#d6d6d6
| 34878 ||  || — || October 16, 2001 || Socorro || LINEAR || EOS || align=right | 4.6 km || 
|-id=879 bgcolor=#E9E9E9
| 34879 Tripathiishan ||  ||  || October 16, 2001 || Socorro || LINEAR || RAF || align=right | 6.9 km || 
|-id=880 bgcolor=#d6d6d6
| 34880 ||  || — || October 17, 2001 || Socorro || LINEAR || 7:4 || align=right | 6.6 km || 
|-id=881 bgcolor=#d6d6d6
| 34881 ||  || — || October 17, 2001 || Socorro || LINEAR || — || align=right | 6.9 km || 
|-id=882 bgcolor=#fefefe
| 34882 ||  || — || October 18, 2001 || Socorro || LINEAR || — || align=right | 4.1 km || 
|-id=883 bgcolor=#d6d6d6
| 34883 ||  || — || October 19, 2001 || Haleakala || NEAT || ALA || align=right | 8.8 km || 
|-id=884 bgcolor=#fefefe
| 34884 ||  || — || October 22, 2001 || Socorro || LINEAR || — || align=right | 3.2 km || 
|-id=885 bgcolor=#E9E9E9
| 34885 ||  || — || November 10, 2001 || Socorro || LINEAR || — || align=right | 6.8 km || 
|-id=886 bgcolor=#E9E9E9
| 34886 ||  || — || November 10, 2001 || Socorro || LINEAR || — || align=right | 4.4 km || 
|-id=887 bgcolor=#fefefe
| 34887 ||  || — || November 10, 2001 || Socorro || LINEAR || — || align=right | 5.1 km || 
|-id=888 bgcolor=#E9E9E9
| 34888 ||  || — || November 7, 2001 || Palomar || NEAT || — || align=right | 4.8 km || 
|-id=889 bgcolor=#fefefe
| 34889 ||  || — || November 9, 2001 || Socorro || LINEAR || — || align=right | 2.0 km || 
|-id=890 bgcolor=#fefefe
| 34890 Vasikaran ||  ||  || November 10, 2001 || Socorro || LINEAR || SUL || align=right | 7.1 km || 
|-id=891 bgcolor=#fefefe
| 34891 ||  || — || November 10, 2001 || Socorro || LINEAR || V || align=right | 2.1 km || 
|-id=892 bgcolor=#E9E9E9
| 34892 Evapalisa ||  ||  || November 15, 2001 || Uccle || H. Debehogne, E. W. Elst || — || align=right | 3.3 km || 
|-id=893 bgcolor=#fefefe
| 34893 Mihomasatoshi ||  ||  || November 17, 2001 || Bisei SG Center || BATTeRS || — || align=right | 2.6 km || 
|-id=894 bgcolor=#E9E9E9
| 34894 || 2012 P-L || — || September 24, 1960 || Palomar || PLS || — || align=right | 3.2 km || 
|-id=895 bgcolor=#E9E9E9
| 34895 || 2026 P-L || — || September 24, 1960 || Palomar || PLS || — || align=right | 8.5 km || 
|-id=896 bgcolor=#E9E9E9
| 34896 || 2117 P-L || — || September 24, 1960 || Palomar || PLS || — || align=right | 4.8 km || 
|-id=897 bgcolor=#fefefe
| 34897 || 2537 P-L || — || September 24, 1960 || Palomar || PLS || — || align=right | 2.6 km || 
|-id=898 bgcolor=#d6d6d6
| 34898 || 2622 P-L || — || September 24, 1960 || Palomar || PLS || THM || align=right | 8.7 km || 
|-id=899 bgcolor=#fefefe
| 34899 || 2628 P-L || — || September 24, 1960 || Palomar || PLS || — || align=right | 4.0 km || 
|-id=900 bgcolor=#fefefe
| 34900 || 2698 P-L || — || September 24, 1960 || Palomar || PLS || — || align=right | 2.5 km || 
|}

34901–35000 

|-bgcolor=#d6d6d6
| 34901 Mauna Loa || 2699 P-L ||  || September 24, 1960 || Palomar || PLS || — || align=right | 5.3 km || 
|-id=902 bgcolor=#d6d6d6
| 34902 || 2728 P-L || — || September 24, 1960 || Palomar || PLS || 629 || align=right | 4.2 km || 
|-id=903 bgcolor=#d6d6d6
| 34903 || 3037 P-L || — || September 24, 1960 || Palomar || PLS || — || align=right | 9.7 km || 
|-id=904 bgcolor=#d6d6d6
| 34904 || 3085 P-L || — || September 25, 1960 || Palomar || PLS || — || align=right | 10 km || 
|-id=905 bgcolor=#d6d6d6
| 34905 || 3110 P-L || — || September 24, 1960 || Palomar || PLS || — || align=right | 7.6 km || 
|-id=906 bgcolor=#d6d6d6
| 34906 || 3116 P-L || — || September 24, 1960 || Palomar || PLS || — || align=right | 4.8 km || 
|-id=907 bgcolor=#fefefe
| 34907 || 3527 P-L || — || October 17, 1960 || Palomar || PLS || — || align=right | 3.4 km || 
|-id=908 bgcolor=#E9E9E9
| 34908 || 3528 P-L || — || October 17, 1960 || Palomar || PLS || — || align=right | 4.3 km || 
|-id=909 bgcolor=#E9E9E9
| 34909 || 3534 P-L || — || October 17, 1960 || Palomar || PLS || GAL || align=right | 4.0 km || 
|-id=910 bgcolor=#d6d6d6
| 34910 || 4052 P-L || — || September 24, 1960 || Palomar || PLS || — || align=right | 3.8 km || 
|-id=911 bgcolor=#fefefe
| 34911 || 4288 P-L || — || September 24, 1960 || Palomar || PLS || — || align=right | 2.0 km || 
|-id=912 bgcolor=#E9E9E9
| 34912 || 4314 P-L || — || September 24, 1960 || Palomar || PLS || — || align=right | 3.6 km || 
|-id=913 bgcolor=#fefefe
| 34913 || 4527 P-L || — || September 24, 1960 || Palomar || PLS || NYS || align=right | 2.9 km || 
|-id=914 bgcolor=#d6d6d6
| 34914 || 4535 P-L || — || September 24, 1960 || Palomar || PLS || THM || align=right | 7.9 km || 
|-id=915 bgcolor=#d6d6d6
| 34915 || 4564 P-L || — || September 24, 1960 || Palomar || PLS || THM || align=right | 5.3 km || 
|-id=916 bgcolor=#fefefe
| 34916 || 4595 P-L || — || September 24, 1960 || Palomar || PLS || NYS || align=right | 4.7 km || 
|-id=917 bgcolor=#E9E9E9
| 34917 || 4616 P-L || — || September 24, 1960 || Palomar || PLS || XIZ || align=right | 3.5 km || 
|-id=918 bgcolor=#E9E9E9
| 34918 || 4654 P-L || — || September 24, 1960 || Palomar || PLS || — || align=right | 2.3 km || 
|-id=919 bgcolor=#d6d6d6
| 34919 Imelda || 4710 P-L ||  || September 24, 1960 || Palomar || PLS || 3:2 || align=right | 7.7 km || 
|-id=920 bgcolor=#fefefe
| 34920 || 4735 P-L || — || September 24, 1960 || Palomar || PLS || — || align=right | 1.7 km || 
|-id=921 bgcolor=#d6d6d6
| 34921 || 4801 P-L || — || September 24, 1960 || Palomar || PLS || THM || align=right | 7.1 km || 
|-id=922 bgcolor=#E9E9E9
| 34922 || 4825 P-L || — || September 24, 1960 || Palomar || PLS || — || align=right | 5.7 km || 
|-id=923 bgcolor=#fefefe
| 34923 || 4870 P-L || — || September 24, 1960 || Palomar || PLS || SUL || align=right | 4.5 km || 
|-id=924 bgcolor=#E9E9E9
| 34924 || 6109 P-L || — || September 24, 1960 || Palomar || PLS || — || align=right | 3.2 km || 
|-id=925 bgcolor=#E9E9E9
| 34925 || 6114 P-L || — || September 24, 1960 || Palomar || PLS || — || align=right | 4.8 km || 
|-id=926 bgcolor=#fefefe
| 34926 || 6133 P-L || — || September 24, 1960 || Palomar || PLS || — || align=right | 2.2 km || 
|-id=927 bgcolor=#fefefe
| 34927 || 6189 P-L || — || September 24, 1960 || Palomar || PLS || — || align=right | 2.0 km || 
|-id=928 bgcolor=#fefefe
| 34928 || 6230 P-L || — || September 24, 1960 || Palomar || PLS || — || align=right | 2.7 km || 
|-id=929 bgcolor=#d6d6d6
| 34929 || 6522 P-L || — || September 26, 1960 || Palomar || PLS || — || align=right | 9.6 km || 
|-id=930 bgcolor=#fefefe
| 34930 || 6570 P-L || — || September 24, 1960 || Palomar || PLS || NYS || align=right | 2.7 km || 
|-id=931 bgcolor=#E9E9E9
| 34931 || 6621 P-L || — || September 24, 1960 || Palomar || PLS || — || align=right | 7.1 km || 
|-id=932 bgcolor=#E9E9E9
| 34932 || 6644 P-L || — || September 26, 1960 || Palomar || PLS || — || align=right | 3.0 km || 
|-id=933 bgcolor=#d6d6d6
| 34933 || 6652 P-L || — || September 24, 1960 || Palomar || PLS || THM || align=right | 8.6 km || 
|-id=934 bgcolor=#d6d6d6
| 34934 || 6689 P-L || — || September 24, 1960 || Palomar || PLS || — || align=right | 8.6 km || 
|-id=935 bgcolor=#d6d6d6
| 34935 || 6780 P-L || — || September 24, 1960 || Palomar || PLS || — || align=right | 7.6 km || 
|-id=936 bgcolor=#E9E9E9
| 34936 || 6861 P-L || — || September 24, 1960 || Palomar || PLS || — || align=right | 5.7 km || 
|-id=937 bgcolor=#fefefe
| 34937 || 9063 P-L || — || October 17, 1960 || Palomar || PLS || FLO || align=right | 2.7 km || 
|-id=938 bgcolor=#d6d6d6
| 34938 || 9562 P-L || — || October 17, 1960 || Palomar || PLS || — || align=right | 5.0 km || 
|-id=939 bgcolor=#fefefe
| 34939 || 9575 P-L || — || October 17, 1960 || Palomar || PLS || — || align=right | 2.4 km || 
|-id=940 bgcolor=#d6d6d6
| 34940 || 9586 P-L || — || October 17, 1960 || Palomar || PLS || HYG || align=right | 9.0 km || 
|-id=941 bgcolor=#E9E9E9
| 34941 || 1244 T-1 || — || March 25, 1971 || Palomar || PLS || HOF || align=right | 7.7 km || 
|-id=942 bgcolor=#fefefe
| 34942 || 1275 T-1 || — || March 25, 1971 || Palomar || PLS || — || align=right | 1.8 km || 
|-id=943 bgcolor=#d6d6d6
| 34943 || 1286 T-1 || — || March 25, 1971 || Palomar || PLS || — || align=right | 3.4 km || 
|-id=944 bgcolor=#d6d6d6
| 34944 || 2202 T-1 || — || March 25, 1971 || Palomar || PLS || — || align=right | 6.0 km || 
|-id=945 bgcolor=#fefefe
| 34945 || 2263 T-1 || — || March 25, 1971 || Palomar || PLS || — || align=right | 2.4 km || 
|-id=946 bgcolor=#E9E9E9
| 34946 || 2286 T-1 || — || March 25, 1971 || Palomar || PLS || — || align=right | 5.0 km || 
|-id=947 bgcolor=#E9E9E9
| 34947 || 3298 T-1 || — || March 26, 1971 || Palomar || PLS || — || align=right | 5.8 km || 
|-id=948 bgcolor=#fefefe
| 34948 || 4103 T-1 || — || March 26, 1971 || Palomar || PLS || NYS || align=right | 2.9 km || 
|-id=949 bgcolor=#d6d6d6
| 34949 || 4111 T-1 || — || March 26, 1971 || Palomar || PLS || — || align=right | 6.2 km || 
|-id=950 bgcolor=#fefefe
| 34950 || 4188 T-1 || — || March 26, 1971 || Palomar || PLS || — || align=right | 1.9 km || 
|-id=951 bgcolor=#d6d6d6
| 34951 || 4221 T-1 || — || March 26, 1971 || Palomar || PLS || — || align=right | 7.1 km || 
|-id=952 bgcolor=#d6d6d6
| 34952 || 4874 T-1 || — || May 13, 1971 || Palomar || PLS || — || align=right | 6.1 km || 
|-id=953 bgcolor=#d6d6d6
| 34953 || 1008 T-2 || — || September 29, 1973 || Palomar || PLS || — || align=right | 7.0 km || 
|-id=954 bgcolor=#E9E9E9
| 34954 || 1032 T-2 || — || September 29, 1973 || Palomar || PLS || HEN || align=right | 3.4 km || 
|-id=955 bgcolor=#fefefe
| 34955 || 1044 T-2 || — || September 29, 1973 || Palomar || PLS || FLO || align=right | 2.9 km || 
|-id=956 bgcolor=#d6d6d6
| 34956 || 1327 T-2 || — || September 29, 1973 || Palomar || PLS || — || align=right | 7.4 km || 
|-id=957 bgcolor=#d6d6d6
| 34957 || 1347 T-2 || — || September 29, 1973 || Palomar || PLS || THM || align=right | 7.3 km || 
|-id=958 bgcolor=#E9E9E9
| 34958 || 1357 T-2 || — || September 29, 1973 || Palomar || PLS || — || align=right | 5.2 km || 
|-id=959 bgcolor=#fefefe
| 34959 || 2077 T-2 || — || September 29, 1973 || Palomar || PLS || — || align=right | 1.8 km || 
|-id=960 bgcolor=#d6d6d6
| 34960 || 2100 T-2 || — || September 29, 1973 || Palomar || PLS || URS || align=right | 6.4 km || 
|-id=961 bgcolor=#E9E9E9
| 34961 || 2252 T-2 || — || September 29, 1973 || Palomar || PLS || GEF || align=right | 4.9 km || 
|-id=962 bgcolor=#d6d6d6
| 34962 || 2307 T-2 || — || September 29, 1973 || Palomar || PLS || — || align=right | 4.6 km || 
|-id=963 bgcolor=#E9E9E9
| 34963 || 3091 T-2 || — || September 30, 1973 || Palomar || PLS || GEF || align=right | 3.3 km || 
|-id=964 bgcolor=#fefefe
| 34964 || 3122 T-2 || — || September 30, 1973 || Palomar || PLS || — || align=right | 5.9 km || 
|-id=965 bgcolor=#d6d6d6
| 34965 || 3221 T-2 || — || September 30, 1973 || Palomar || PLS || THM || align=right | 5.5 km || 
|-id=966 bgcolor=#E9E9E9
| 34966 || 3260 T-2 || — || September 30, 1973 || Palomar || PLS || — || align=right | 7.3 km || 
|-id=967 bgcolor=#E9E9E9
| 34967 || 3269 T-2 || — || September 30, 1973 || Palomar || PLS || DOR || align=right | 6.8 km || 
|-id=968 bgcolor=#d6d6d6
| 34968 || 4094 T-2 || — || September 29, 1973 || Palomar || PLS || — || align=right | 6.8 km || 
|-id=969 bgcolor=#fefefe
| 34969 || 4108 T-2 || — || September 29, 1973 || Palomar || PLS || FLO || align=right | 1.7 km || 
|-id=970 bgcolor=#d6d6d6
| 34970 || 4218 T-2 || — || September 29, 1973 || Palomar || PLS || — || align=right | 7.5 km || 
|-id=971 bgcolor=#d6d6d6
| 34971 || 4286 T-2 || — || September 29, 1973 || Palomar || PLS || EOS || align=right | 4.6 km || 
|-id=972 bgcolor=#d6d6d6
| 34972 || 5039 T-2 || — || September 25, 1973 || Palomar || PLS || — || align=right | 6.3 km || 
|-id=973 bgcolor=#d6d6d6
| 34973 || 5157 T-2 || — || September 25, 1973 || Palomar || PLS || EOS || align=right | 3.5 km || 
|-id=974 bgcolor=#d6d6d6
| 34974 || 5164 T-2 || — || September 25, 1973 || Palomar || PLS || — || align=right | 7.7 km || 
|-id=975 bgcolor=#d6d6d6
| 34975 || 1050 T-3 || — || October 17, 1977 || Palomar || PLS || — || align=right | 8.8 km || 
|-id=976 bgcolor=#fefefe
| 34976 || 1115 T-3 || — || October 17, 1977 || Palomar || PLS || — || align=right | 2.5 km || 
|-id=977 bgcolor=#E9E9E9
| 34977 || 1167 T-3 || — || October 17, 1977 || Palomar || PLS || — || align=right | 6.3 km || 
|-id=978 bgcolor=#d6d6d6
| 34978 van 't Hoff || 1901 T-3 ||  || October 17, 1977 || Palomar || PLS || VER || align=right | 10 km || 
|-id=979 bgcolor=#fefefe
| 34979 || 2173 T-3 || — || October 16, 1977 || Palomar || PLS || — || align=right | 2.8 km || 
|-id=980 bgcolor=#fefefe
| 34980 || 2307 T-3 || — || October 16, 1977 || Palomar || PLS || — || align=right | 2.4 km || 
|-id=981 bgcolor=#fefefe
| 34981 || 2342 T-3 || — || October 16, 1977 || Palomar || PLS || — || align=right | 2.2 km || 
|-id=982 bgcolor=#fefefe
| 34982 || 2494 T-3 || — || October 16, 1977 || Palomar || PLS || — || align=right | 2.4 km || 
|-id=983 bgcolor=#fefefe
| 34983 || 3046 T-3 || — || October 16, 1977 || Palomar || PLS || — || align=right | 2.2 km || 
|-id=984 bgcolor=#d6d6d6
| 34984 || 3163 T-3 || — || October 16, 1977 || Palomar || PLS || LUT || align=right | 11 km || 
|-id=985 bgcolor=#E9E9E9
| 34985 || 3286 T-3 || — || October 16, 1977 || Palomar || PLS || — || align=right | 6.4 km || 
|-id=986 bgcolor=#E9E9E9
| 34986 || 3837 T-3 || — || October 16, 1977 || Palomar || PLS || — || align=right | 5.3 km || 
|-id=987 bgcolor=#d6d6d6
| 34987 || 4065 T-3 || — || October 16, 1977 || Palomar || PLS || HYG || align=right | 8.3 km || 
|-id=988 bgcolor=#E9E9E9
| 34988 || 4222 T-3 || — || October 16, 1977 || Palomar || PLS || GEF || align=right | 3.4 km || 
|-id=989 bgcolor=#E9E9E9
| 34989 || 4251 T-3 || — || October 16, 1977 || Palomar || PLS || — || align=right | 3.9 km || 
|-id=990 bgcolor=#E9E9E9
| 34990 || 4270 T-3 || — || October 16, 1977 || Palomar || PLS || — || align=right | 5.4 km || 
|-id=991 bgcolor=#fefefe
| 34991 || 4295 T-3 || — || October 16, 1977 || Palomar || PLS || SUL || align=right | 2.4 km || 
|-id=992 bgcolor=#E9E9E9
| 34992 || 4418 T-3 || — || October 16, 1977 || Palomar || PLS || — || align=right | 3.6 km || 
|-id=993 bgcolor=#C2FFFF
| 34993 Euaimon ||  ||  || September 20, 1973 || Palomar || PLS || L4 || align=right | 19 km || 
|-id=994 bgcolor=#E9E9E9
| 34994 ||  || — || February 11, 1977 || Palomar || S. J. Bus || — || align=right | 4.2 km || 
|-id=995 bgcolor=#d6d6d6
| 34995 Dainihonshi ||  ||  || February 18, 1977 || Kiso || H. Kosai, K. Furukawa || — || align=right | 5.7 km || 
|-id=996 bgcolor=#E9E9E9
| 34996 Mitokoumon ||  ||  || February 18, 1977 || Kiso || H. Kosai, K. Furukawa || — || align=right | 4.2 km || 
|-id=997 bgcolor=#E9E9E9
| 34997 || 1978 OP || — || July 28, 1978 || Bickley || Perth Obs. || EUN || align=right | 6.8 km || 
|-id=998 bgcolor=#E9E9E9
| 34998 || 1978 SE || — || September 27, 1978 || La Silla || R. M. West || — || align=right | 7.6 km || 
|-id=999 bgcolor=#E9E9E9
| 34999 ||  || — || November 7, 1978 || Palomar || E. F. Helin, S. J. Bus || — || align=right | 7.3 km || 
|-id=000 bgcolor=#E9E9E9
| 35000 ||  || — || November 7, 1978 || Palomar || E. F. Helin, S. J. Bus || NEM || align=right | 4.6 km || 
|}

References

External links 
 Discovery Circumstances: Numbered Minor Planets (30001)–(35000) (IAU Minor Planet Center)

0034